= Dictator (disambiguation) =

A dictator is a ruler with total power over a country, typically one who has obtained control by force.

Dictator may also refer to:

== Government ==
- Dictatorship, a form of government where political authority is monopolized by a single person or political entity
- Roman dictator, in the Roman Republic, an extraordinary magistrate with the absolute authority to perform tasks beyond the authority of the ordinary magistrate
  - Dictator perpetuo, a position held by Julius Caesar

== Media, arts and entertainment ==
=== Literature ===
- Dictator (Cain novel), by Tom Cain
- Dictator (Harris novel), by Robert Harris
- Dictator novel, a genre of Latin American literature
- The Dictator (book), a 1893 novel by Justin McCarthy (1830-1912)
- The Dictators: Hitler's Germany and Stalin's Russia, a 2004 book by Richard Overy on the historical analysis of Hitler and Stalin's dictatorships
- The Dictators: 64 Dictators, 64 Authors, 64 Warnings from History, a 2024 book collection of essays by Iain Dale on the history and patterns of Dictators through human history

=== Film, television and theatre ===
- The Dictator (play), a 1904 play by Richard Harding Davis
- The Dictator (1915 film), a silent film comedy directed by Oscar Eagle based on the 1904 play
- The Dictator (1922 film), a silent film comedy directed by James Cruze based on the 1904 play
- The Dictator (1935 film), a British historical drama film directed by Victor Saville
- The Dictator, a 2012 comedy film directed by Larry Charles starring Sacha Baron Cohen
- Dictator (2016 film), a 2016 Indian Telugu-language action film
- The Dictator (TV series), a 1995 Malaysian TV series

=== Games ===
- Dictator, a vehicle in the G.I. Joe: A Real American Hero line of toys
- M. Bison, a villain from the Street Fighter video game series also known as Dictator.
- Dictator, video game released in 1983 by DK'Tronics and running on Sinclair's ZX Spectrum

=== Music ===
- "Dictator" (Centerfold song), 1986
- "Dictator" (The Clash song)
- Dictator (Daron Malakian and Scars on Broadway album), 2018
- Dictator (Diaura album), 2011
- The Dictators, an American proto-punk and punk rock band
- The Dictator (soundtrack), 2012 soundtrack record by Aladeen Records for the movie of the same name by Larry Charles
- Mighty Dictator, or Dictator, born Kenneth St. Bernard, Trinidadian calypsonian

== Military ==
- the Dictator. a type of Siege artillery in the American Civil War, specifically a mortar
- HMS Dictator (1783), a 64-gun third-rate ship of the line of the Royal Navy
- USS Dictator (1863), a single-turreted ironclad monitor of the United States Navy

== Other uses ==
- Dictator game, a game in experimental economics
- Dictator (beetle), a genus of beetles
- Studebaker Dictator, an automobile produced by the Studebaker Corporation of South Bend, Indiana from 1927 to 1937

== See also ==
- Führer (disambiguation), the German word Führer used in place of dictator in some contexts
- The Great Dictator, a 1940 film starring Charlie Chaplin
