= Mionochroma subaurosum =

Scientific classification
- Domain: Eukaryota
- Kingdom: Animalia
- Phylum: Arthropoda
- Class: Insecta
- Order: Coleoptera
- Suborder: Polyphaga
- Infraorder: Cucujiformia
- Family: Cerambycidae
- Subfamily: Cerambycinae
- Tribe: Callichromatini
- Genus: Mionochroma
- Species: M. subaurosum

Binomial name
- Mionochroma subaurosum (Zajciw, 1966)

Synonyms
- Callichroma subaurosum Zajciw, 1966

Species of beetle

Mionochroma subaurosum is a species of beetle in the family Cerambycidae. It was described by Zajciw in 1966. It is known from Peru, Bolivia, and Brazil.
