= Mionochroma novella =

Scientific classification
- Domain: Eukaryota
- Kingdom: Animalia
- Phylum: Arthropoda
- Class: Insecta
- Order: Coleoptera
- Suborder: Polyphaga
- Infraorder: Cucujiformia
- Family: Cerambycidae
- Subfamily: Cerambycinae
- Tribe: Callichromatini
- Genus: Mionochroma
- Species: M. novella

Binomial name
- Mionochroma novella (Bates, 1885)

Synonyms
- Callichroma novella Blackwelder, 1946

Species of beetle

Mionochroma novella is a species of beetle in the family Cerambycidae. It was described by Henry Walter Bates in 1885. It is known from Nicaragua and Panama.
