= Mionochroma pseudovittatum =

Scientific classification
- Domain: Eukaryota
- Kingdom: Animalia
- Phylum: Arthropoda
- Class: Insecta
- Order: Coleoptera
- Suborder: Polyphaga
- Infraorder: Cucujiformia
- Family: Cerambycidae
- Subfamily: Cerambycinae
- Tribe: Callichromatini
- Genus: Mionochroma
- Species: M. pseudovittatum

Binomial name
- Mionochroma pseudovittatum (Schwarzer, 1923)

Synonyms
- Callichroma pseudovittata Blackwelder, 1946; Callichroma pseudovittatum Costa Lima, 1955

Species of beetle

Mionochroma pseudovittatum is a species of beetle in the family Cerambycidae. It was described by Schwarzer in 1923. It is known from southeastern Brazil.
