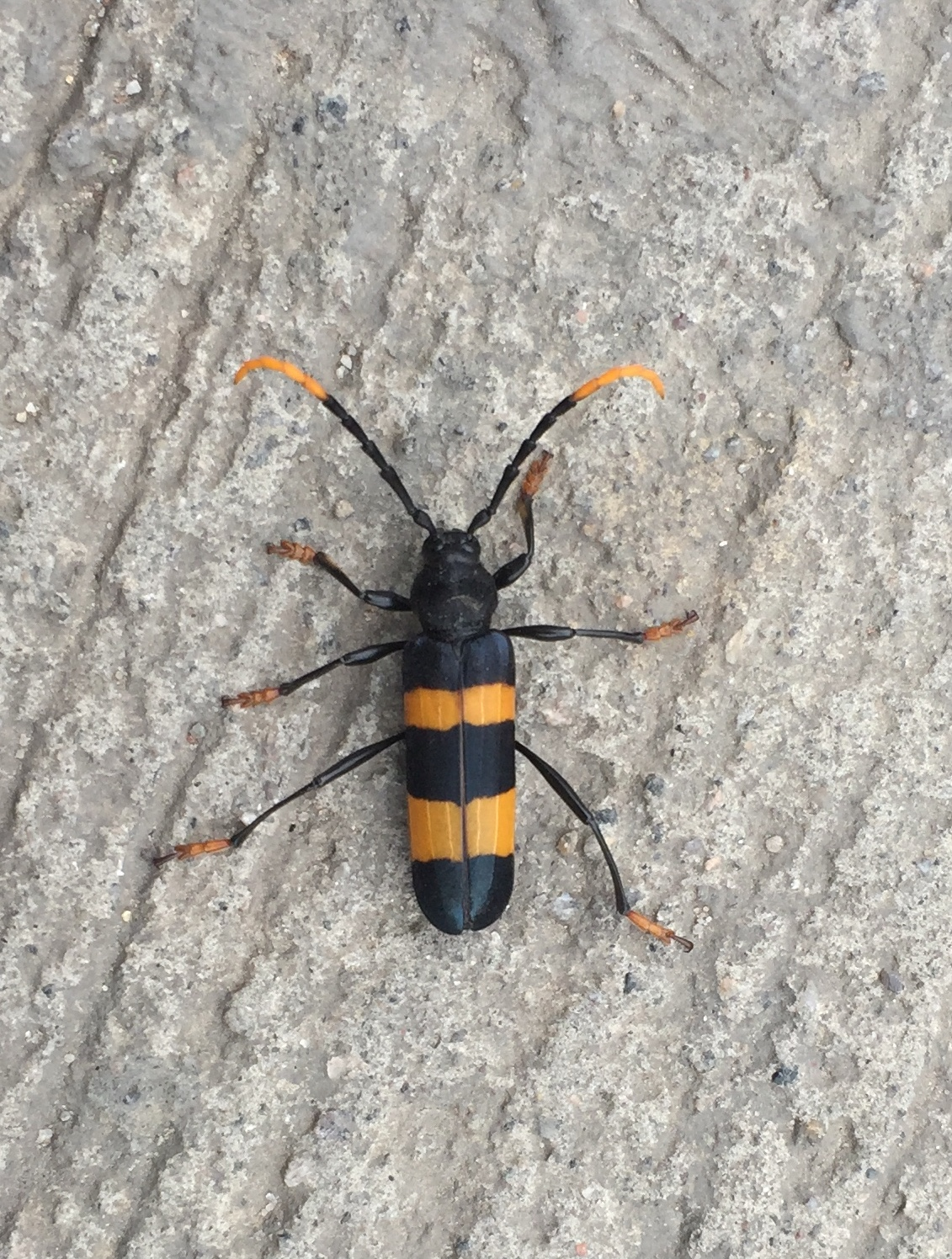
- A specimen from Bangalore

Scientific classification
- Domain: Eukaryota
- Kingdom: Animalia
- Phylum: Arthropoda
- Class: Insecta
- Order: Coleoptera
- Suborder: Polyphaga
- Infraorder: Cucujiformia
- Family: Cerambycidae
- Genus: Zonopterus
- Species: Z. consanguineus

Binomial name
- Zonopterus consanguineus Ritsema, 1889

= Zonopterus consanguineus =

Species of beetle

Zonopterus consanguineus is a species of beetle in the family Cerambycidae. Like other beetles in the tribe Callichromatini it is brightly coloured with orange bands on black. It is very similar to Zonopterus flavitarsis which is found in northeastern India but has the first five or six antennal segments black and the anterior band is narrower. The elytra sometimes shows a bluish tint at the apex. The species has been recorded from peninsular India.
