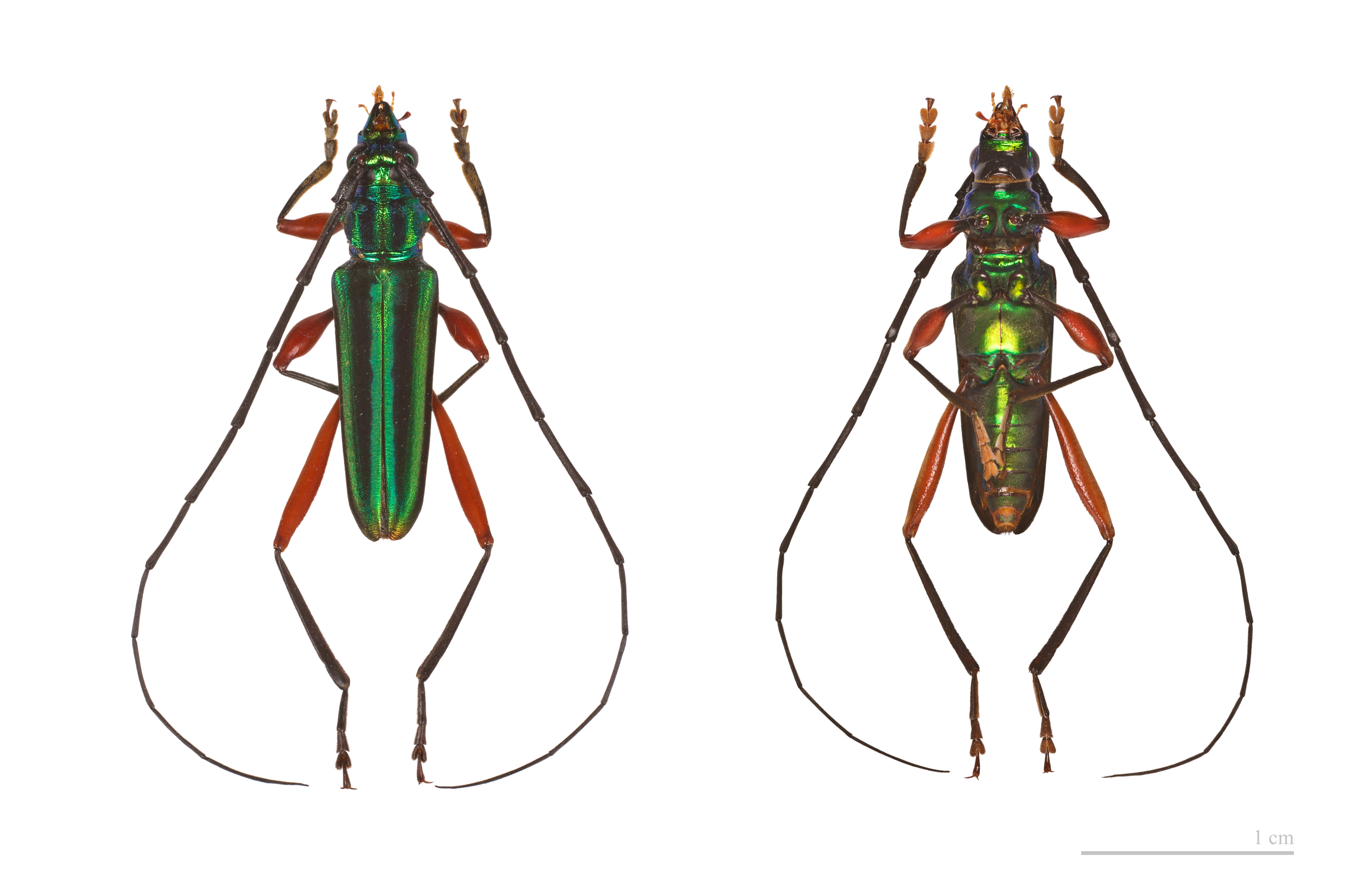
- Two views of a male specimen

Scientific classification
- Domain: Eukaryota
- Kingdom: Animalia
- Phylum: Arthropoda
- Class: Insecta
- Order: Coleoptera
- Suborder: Polyphaga
- Infraorder: Cucujiformia
- Family: Cerambycidae
- Subfamily: Cerambycinae
- Tribe: Callichromatini
- Genus: Mionochroma
- Species: M. aureotinctum

Binomial name
- Mionochroma aureotinctum (Bates, 1870)

Synonyms
- Callichroma aureotincta Bates, 1885; Callichroma aureotinctum Bates, 1870; Mionochroma aureotincta Chemsak, Linsley & Noguera, 1992; Mionochroma aurosum (Schmidt, 1924)

= Mionochroma aureotinctum =

Species of beetle

Mionochroma aureotinctum is a species of beetle in the family Cerambycidae. It was described by Henry Walter Bates in 1870. It is known from Mexico, Panama, the Guianas, Peru, and Brazil.
