= Mionochroma subnitescens =

Scientific classification
- Domain: Eukaryota
- Kingdom: Animalia
- Phylum: Arthropoda
- Class: Insecta
- Order: Coleoptera
- Suborder: Polyphaga
- Infraorder: Cucujiformia
- Family: Cerambycidae
- Subfamily: Cerambycinae
- Tribe: Callichromatini
- Genus: Mionochroma
- Species: M. subnitescens

Binomial name
- Mionochroma subnitescens (Gounelle, 1911)

Synonyms
- Callichroma equestre subnitescens Schmidt, 1924; Callichroma equestris subnitescens Blackwelder, 1946; Mionochroma equestre subnitens Podaný, 1965; Mionochroma equestre subnitescens Monné, 1993

Species of beetle

Mionochroma subnitescens is a species of beetle in the family Cerambycidae. It was described by Gounelle in 1911. It is known from Brazil.
