= Mionochroma ocreatum =

Scientific classification
- Kingdom: Animalia
- Phylum: Arthropoda
- Class: Insecta
- Order: Coleoptera
- Suborder: Polyphaga
- Infraorder: Cucujiformia
- Family: Cerambycidae
- Subfamily: Cerambycinae
- Tribe: Callichromatini
- Genus: Mionochroma
- Species: M. ocreatum

Binomial name
- Mionochroma ocreatum (Bates, 1870)

Synonyms
- Callichroma ocreata Blackwelder, 1946; Callichroma ocreatum Villiers, 1971

Species of beetle

Mionochroma ocreatum is a species of beetle in the family Cerambycidae. It was described by Henry Walter Bates in 1870. It is known from French Guiana, northwestern Brazil, Peru, Ecuador, and Colombia.
