= Mionochroma elegans =

Scientific classification
- Kingdom: Animalia
- Phylum: Arthropoda
- Clade: Pancrustacea
- Class: Insecta
- Order: Coleoptera
- Suborder: Polyphaga
- Infraorder: Cucujiformia
- Family: Cerambycidae
- Subfamily: Cerambycinae
- Tribe: Callichromatini
- Genus: Mionochroma
- Species: M. elegans

Binomial name
- Mionochroma elegans (Olivier, 1790)

Synonyms
- Callichroma elegans Monné, 1993; Callichroma elegans gahani Aurivillius, 1912; Cerambix elegans Olivier, 1795; Cerambyx elegans Olivier, 1790; Mionochroma elegans gahani Podaný, 1965

Species of beetle

Mionochroma elegans is a species of beetle in the family Cerambycidae. It was described by Guillaume-Antoine Olivier in 1790. It is known from Guadeloupe, Grenada, Dominica, and St. Lucia.
