= Mionochroma spinosissimum =

Scientific classification
- Domain: Eukaryota
- Kingdom: Animalia
- Phylum: Arthropoda
- Class: Insecta
- Order: Coleoptera
- Suborder: Polyphaga
- Infraorder: Cucujiformia
- Family: Cerambycidae
- Subfamily: Cerambycinae
- Tribe: Callichromatini
- Genus: Mionochroma
- Species: M. spinosissimum

Binomial name
- Mionochroma spinosissimum (Schmidt, 1924)

Synonyms
- Callichroma spinosissima Blackwelder, 1946; Callichroma spinosissimum Schmidt, 1924

Species of beetle

Mionochroma spinosissimum is a species of beetle in the family Cerambycidae. It was described by Schmidt in 1924. It is known from Peru.
