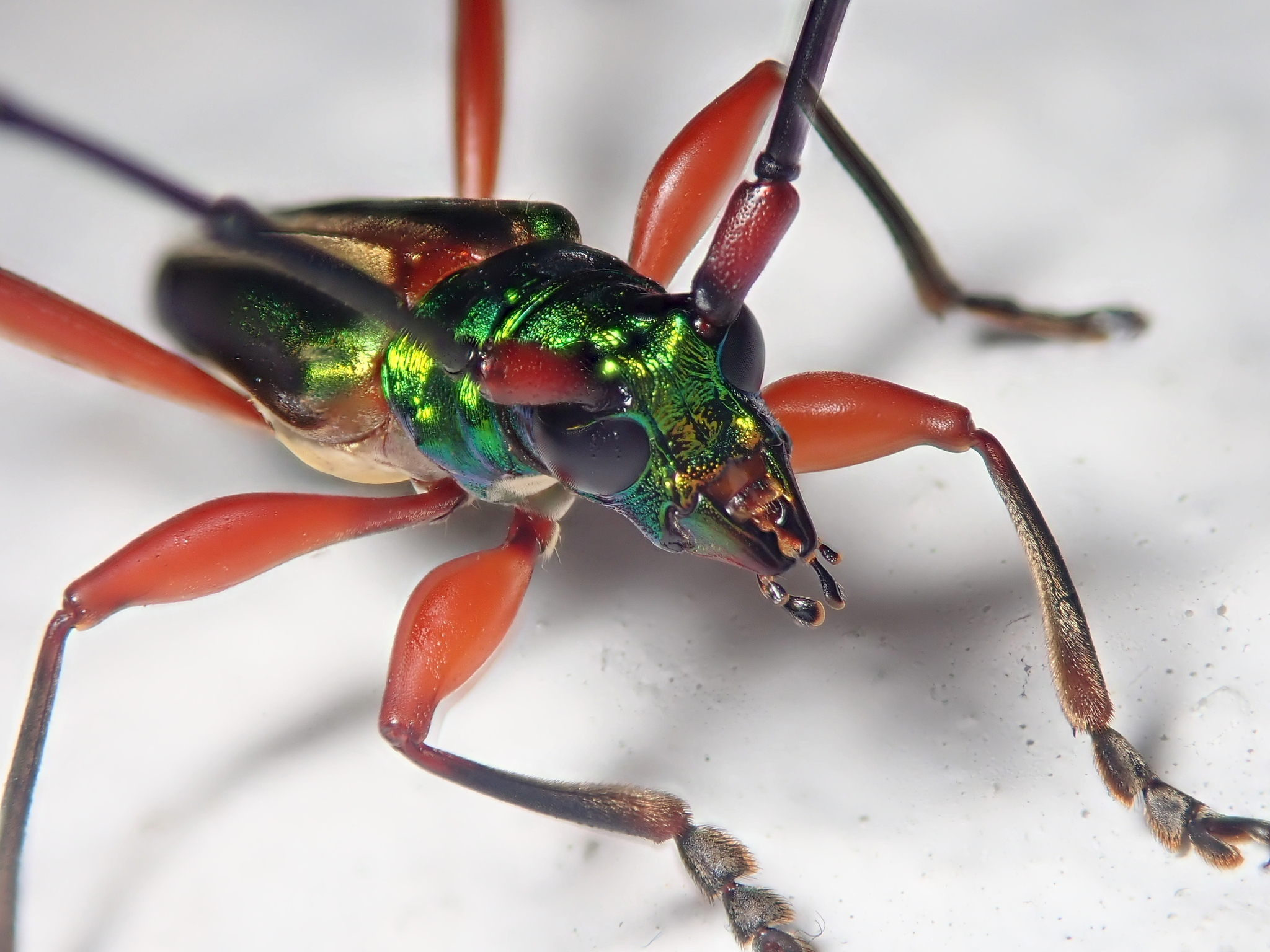
- Mionochroma electrinum, Brasil

Scientific classification
- Kingdom: Animalia
- Phylum: Arthropoda
- Clade: Pancrustacea
- Class: Insecta
- Order: Coleoptera
- Suborder: Polyphaga
- Infraorder: Cucujiformia
- Family: Cerambycidae
- Subfamily: Cerambycinae
- Tribe: Callichromatini
- Genus: Mionochroma
- Species: M. electrinum

Binomial name
- Mionochroma electrinum (Gounelle, 1911)

Synonyms
- Callichroma vittatum electrinum Gounelle, 1911; Callichroma (Mionochroma) vittatum electrinum Schmidt, 1924; Mionochroma vittatum electrinum Podaný, 1965

= Mionochroma electrinum =

Species of beetle

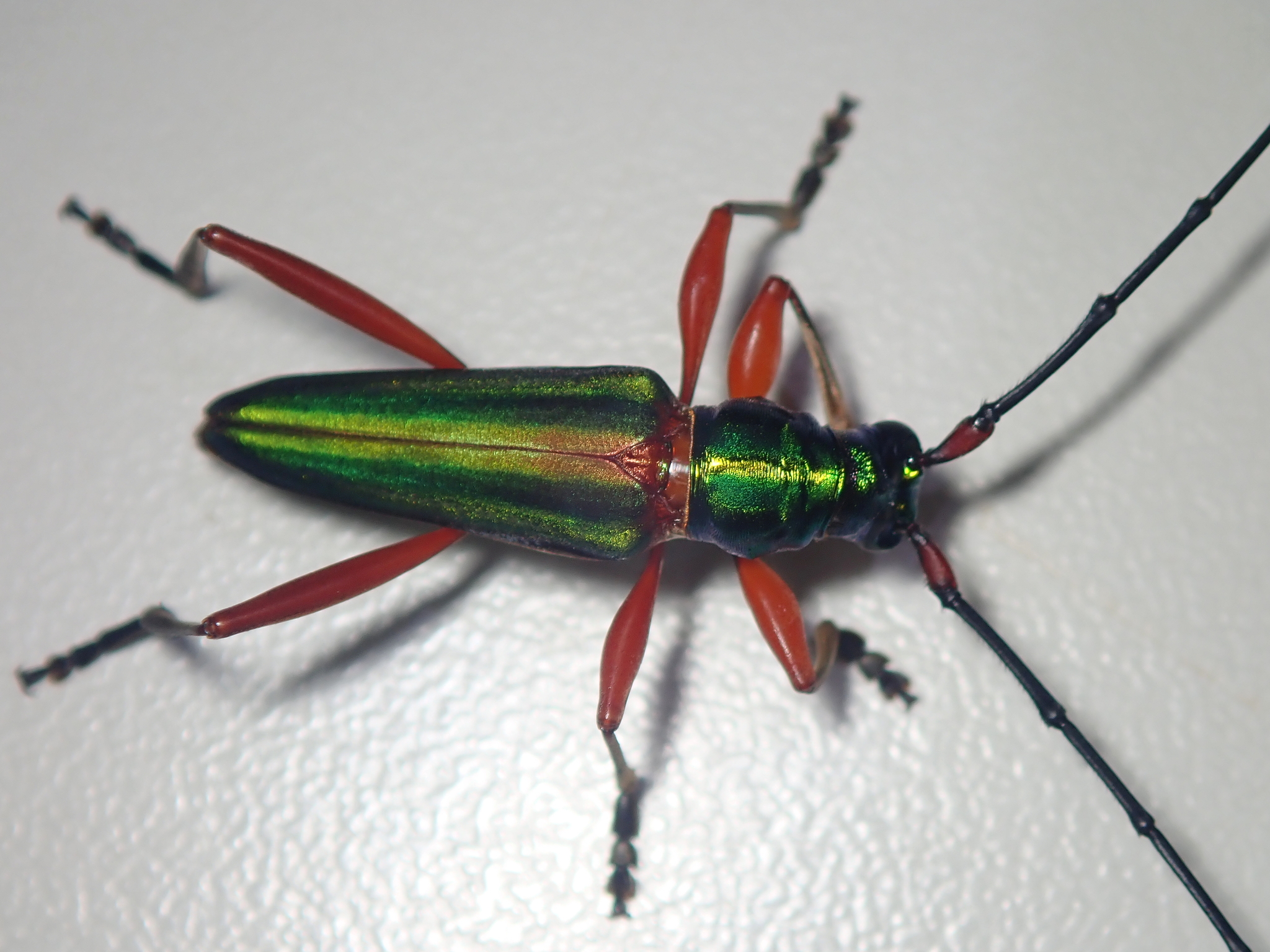
Mionochroma electrinum, Brasil

Mionochroma electrinum is a species of beetle in the family Cerambycidae. It was described by Gounelle in 1911. It is known from Brazil, Paraguay, Argentina, and Uruguay.
