= Mionochroma equestre =

Scientific classification
- Domain: Eukaryota
- Kingdom: Animalia
- Phylum: Arthropoda
- Class: Insecta
- Order: Coleoptera
- Suborder: Polyphaga
- Infraorder: Cucujiformia
- Family: Cerambycidae
- Subfamily: Cerambycinae
- Tribe: Callichromatini
- Genus: Mionochroma
- Species: M. equestre

Binomial name
- Mionochroma equestre (Gounelle, 1911)

Synonyms
- Mionochroma subnitens Podany, 1965; Callichroma equestre Villiers, 1972; Callichroma equestre equestre Zajciw, 1972; Callichroma equestris Blackwelder, 1946; Callichroma equestris equestris Zajciw, 1958; Mionochroma equestre equestre Monné, 2005

Species of beetle

Mionochroma equestre is a species of beetle in the family Cerambycidae. It was described by Gounelle in 1911. It is known from Brazil, Paraguay, and Argentina.
