= Mionochroma rufescens =

Scientific classification
- Domain: Eukaryota
- Kingdom: Animalia
- Phylum: Arthropoda
- Class: Insecta
- Order: Coleoptera
- Suborder: Polyphaga
- Infraorder: Cucujiformia
- Family: Cerambycidae
- Subfamily: Cerambycinae
- Tribe: Callichromatini
- Genus: Mionochroma
- Species: M. rufescens

Binomial name
- Mionochroma rufescens (Gahan, 1895)

Synonyms
- Callichroma rufescens Aurivillius, 1912

Species of beetle

Mionochroma rufescens is a species of beetle in the family Cerambycidae. It was described by Gahan in 1895. It is known from the West Indies and Mexico.
