= Mionochroma wilkei =

Scientific classification
- Kingdom: Animalia
- Phylum: Arthropoda
- Class: Insecta
- Order: Coleoptera
- Suborder: Polyphaga
- Infraorder: Cucujiformia
- Family: Cerambycidae
- Subfamily: Cerambycinae
- Tribe: Callichromatini
- Genus: Mionochroma
- Species: M. wilkei

Binomial name
- Mionochroma wilkei (Schmidt, 1924)

Synonyms
- Callichroma wilkei Schmidt, 1924

Species of beetle

Mionochroma wilkei is a species of beetle in the family Cerambycidae. It was described by Schmidt in 1924. It is known from Panama and Ecuador.
