= Mionochroma chloe =

Scientific classification
- Kingdom: Animalia
- Phylum: Arthropoda
- Clade: Pancrustacea
- Class: Insecta
- Order: Coleoptera
- Suborder: Polyphaga
- Infraorder: Cucujiformia
- Family: Cerambycidae
- Subfamily: Cerambycinae
- Tribe: Callichromatini
- Genus: Mionochroma
- Species: M. chloe

Binomial name
- Mionochroma chloe (Gounelle, 1911)

Synonyms
- Callichroma chloe Biezanko & Bosq, 1956

Species of beetle

Mionochroma chloe is a species of beetle in the family Cerambycidae. It was described by Gounelle in 1911. It is known from southeastern Brazil (Bahia, Minas Gerais, Espírito Santo, Rio de Janeiro, São Paulo, Paraná, Santa Catarina, Rio Grande do Sul), Paraguay, and Argentina.
