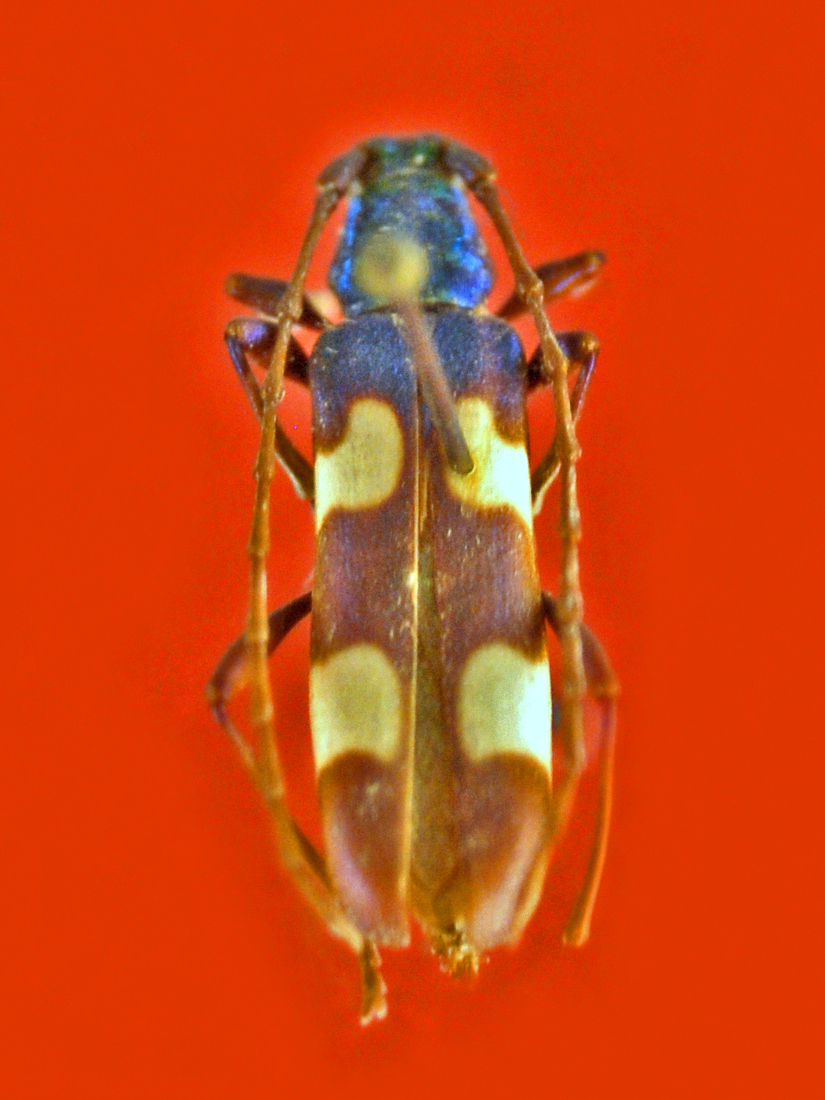
- Anubis subobtusus. Mounted specimen.

Scientific classification
- Kingdom: Animalia
- Phylum: Arthropoda
- Class: Insecta
- Order: Coleoptera
- Suborder: Polyphaga
- Infraorder: Cucujiformia
- Family: Cerambycidae
- Subfamily: Cerambycinae
- Tribe: Callichromatini
- Genus: Anubis
- Species: A. subobtusus

Binomial name
- Anubis subobtusus (Pic, 1932)

Synonyms
- Polyzonus subobtusus Pic, 1932; Polyzonus thoracicus Podaný, 1980

= Anubis subobtusus =

Species of beetle

Anubis subobtusus is a species of longhorn beetles belonging to the family Cerambycidae.

== Description ==
Anubis subobtusus can reach a length of about 20 millimetres (0.79 in). Head, pronotum and elytra are bright green with yellow transversal bands on elytra, sometimes lined with blue.

== Distribution ==
This species can be found in Thailand and Viet Nam.
