= Mionochroma flachi =

Scientific classification
- Domain: Eukaryota
- Kingdom: Animalia
- Phylum: Arthropoda
- Class: Insecta
- Order: Coleoptera
- Suborder: Polyphaga
- Infraorder: Cucujiformia
- Family: Cerambycidae
- Subfamily: Cerambycinae
- Tribe: Callichromatini
- Genus: Mionochroma
- Species: M. flachi

Binomial name
- Mionochroma flachi (Schwarzer, 1923)

Synonyms
- Callichroma flachi Blackwelder, 1946

Species of beetle

Mionochroma flachi is a species of beetle in the family Cerambycidae. It was described by Schwarzer in 1923. It is known from southeastern Brazil.
