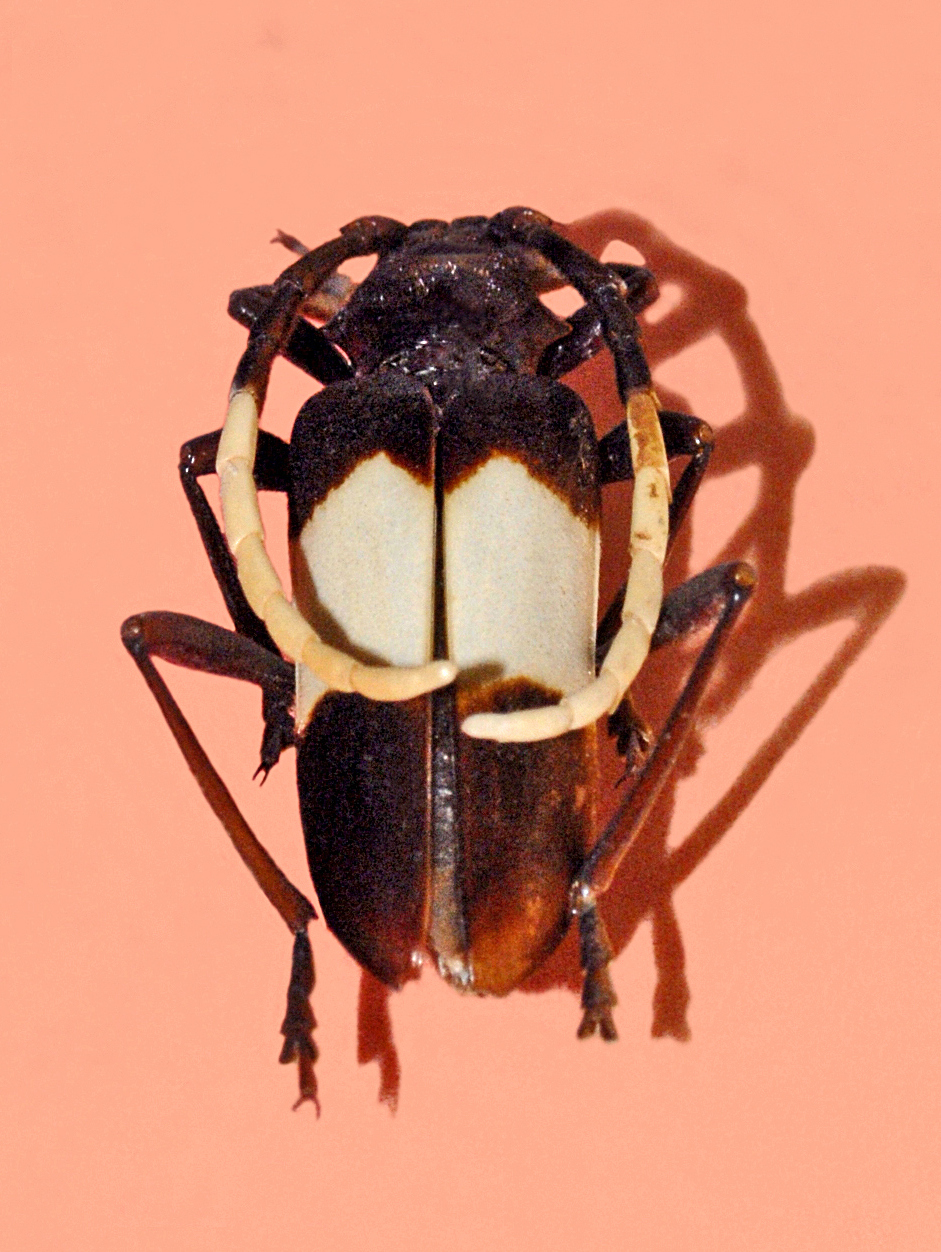
- Museum specimen of Pachyteria dimidiata

Scientific classification
- Domain: Eukaryota
- Kingdom: Animalia
- Phylum: Arthropoda
- Class: Insecta
- Order: Coleoptera
- Suborder: Polyphaga
- Infraorder: Cucujiformia
- Family: Cerambycidae
- Subfamily: Cerambycinae
- Tribe: Callichromatini
- Genus: Pachyteria
- Species: P. dimidiata

Binomial name
- Pachyteria dimidiata Westwood, 1848

Synonyms
- Pachyteria luteofasciata Pic, 1946; Pachyteria oberthueri Ritsema, 1888; Pachyteria oberthüri Ritsema, 1888; Pachyteria scheepmakeri Ritsema, 1881; Pachyteria timorensis Hayashi, 1994

= Pachyteria dimidiata =

Species of beetle

Pachyteria dimidiata, the mimusop stem borer, is a species of round-necked longhorn beetle of the subfamily Cerambycinae.

== Description ==
Pachyteria dimidiata can reach a body length of about 25–29 millimetres (0.98–1.14 in). Body is shining bluish-black, with a broad yellow band nearly across the middle of the elytra and yellow six terminal joints of the hooked antennae. Length of antennae is about equal to the body. This wood boring species is considered a pest on ornamental and fruit trees, especially on the ironwood tree (Mimusops elengi).

== Distribution ==
This species can be found in China, India, Iran, Laos, Malaysia, Sumatra, Thailand, Cambodia and Vietnam.
