= Mionochroma aterrimum =

Scientific classification
- Kingdom: Animalia
- Phylum: Arthropoda
- Class: Insecta
- Order: Coleoptera
- Suborder: Polyphaga
- Infraorder: Cucujiformia
- Family: Cerambycidae
- Subfamily: Cerambycinae
- Tribe: Callichromatini
- Genus: Mionochroma
- Species: M. aterrimum

Binomial name
- Mionochroma aterrimum (Gounelle, 1911)

Synonyms
- Callichroma equestre aterrimum Villiers, 1972; Callichroma equestris aterrima Blackwelder, 1946; Mionochroma equestre aterrimum Monné, 2005

Species of beetle

Mionochroma aterrimum is a species of beetle in the family Cerambycidae. It was described by Gounelle in 1911. It is known from southeastern Brazil.
