= Xystochroma =

Scientific classification
- Kingdom: Animalia
- Phylum: Arthropoda
- Class: Insecta
- Order: Coleoptera
- Suborder: Polyphaga
- Infraorder: Cucujiformia
- Family: Cerambycidae
- Tribe: Callichromatini
- Genus: Xystochroma

Genus of beetles

Xystochroma is a genus of beetles in the family Cerambycidae, containing the following species:

- Xystochroma bouvieri (Gounelle, 1911)
- Xystochroma buprestoides (Bates, 1885)
- Xystochroma chloropus (Bates, 1879)
- Xystochroma clypeatum (Schwarzer, 1923)
- Xystochroma echinatum Napp & Martins, 2005
- Xystochroma femoratum Napp & Martins, 2005
- Xystochroma gracilipes (Bates, 1879)
- Xystochroma incomptum Napp & Martins, 2005
- Xystochroma minutum (Zajciw, 1965)
- Xystochroma neglectum (Gounelle, 1911)
- Xystochroma setigerum (Schmidt, 1924)
- Xystochroma zikani (Zajciw, 1965)
