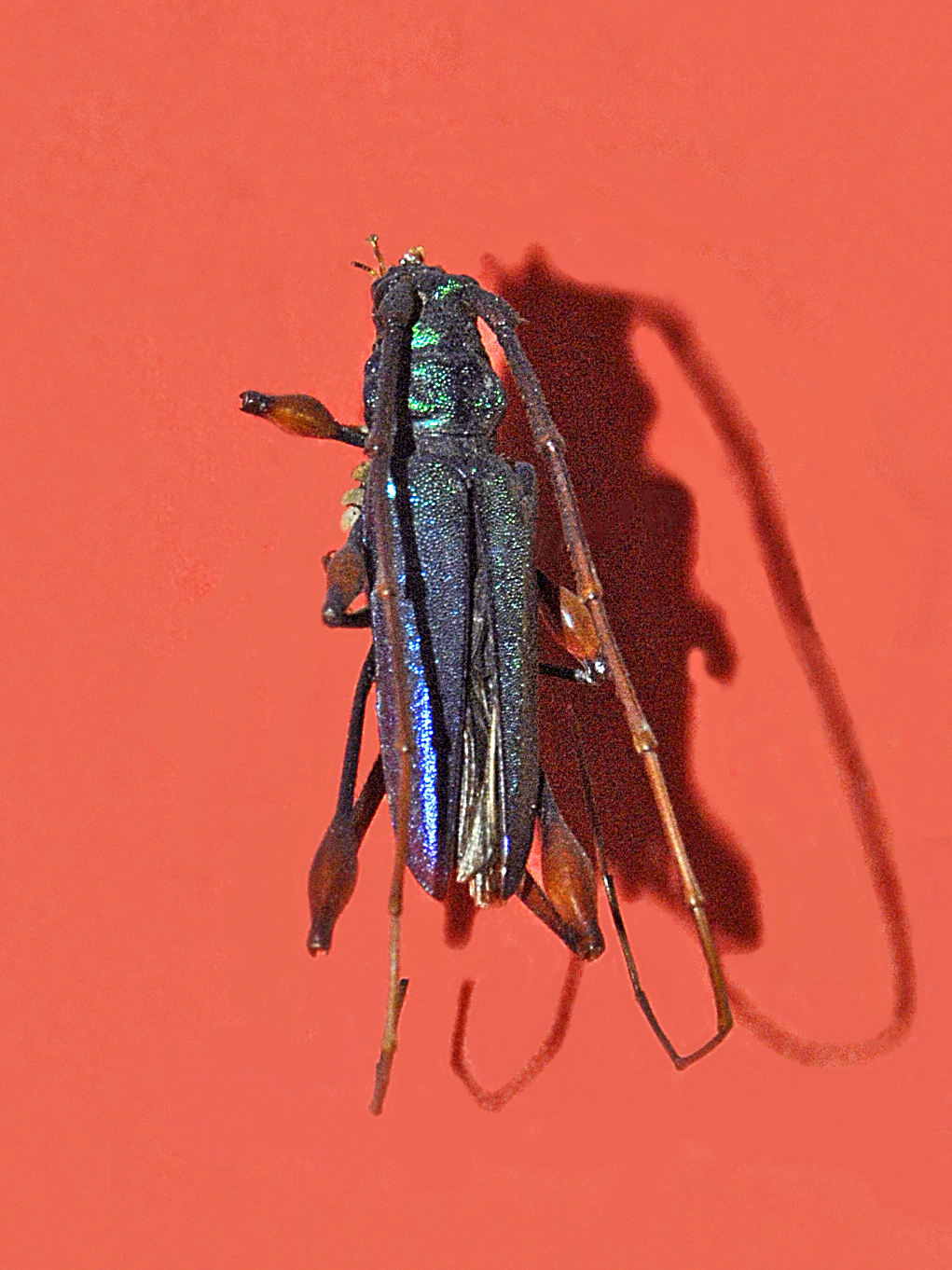
- Museum specimen of Rhopalizus nitens

Scientific classification
- Kingdom: Animalia
- Phylum: Arthropoda
- Class: Insecta
- Order: Coleoptera
- Suborder: Polyphaga
- Infraorder: Cucujiformia
- Family: Cerambycidae
- Tribe: Callichromatini
- Genus: Rhopalizus; Thomson, 1864

= Rhopalizus =

Genus of beetles

Rhopalizus is a genus of round-necked longhorn beetles of the subfamily Cerambycinae.

== Species ==
- Rhopalizus chlorolineatus Quedenfeldt, 1882
- Rhopalizus dorsalis Hintz, 1919
- Rhopalizus euporidus Jordan, 1894
- Rhopalizus femoralis Hintz, 1919
- Rhopalizus laetus Lameere, 1893
- Rhopalizus laevicollis Hintz, 1916
- Rhopalizus nitens (Fabricius, 1781)
- Rhopalizus schweinfurthi Schmidt, 1922
