= Cotychroma =

Scientific classification
- Kingdom: Animalia
- Phylum: Arthropoda
- Class: Insecta
- Order: Coleoptera
- Suborder: Polyphaga
- Infraorder: Cucujiformia
- Family: Cerambycidae
- Subfamily: Cerambycinae
- Tribe: Callichromatini
- Genus: Cotychroma; Martins & Napp, 2005
- Species: C. acaguassu

Binomial name
- Cotychroma acaguassu Martins & Napp, 2005

Genus of beetle

Cotychroma acaguassu is a species of beetle in the family Cerambycidae, the only species in the genus Cotychroma.
