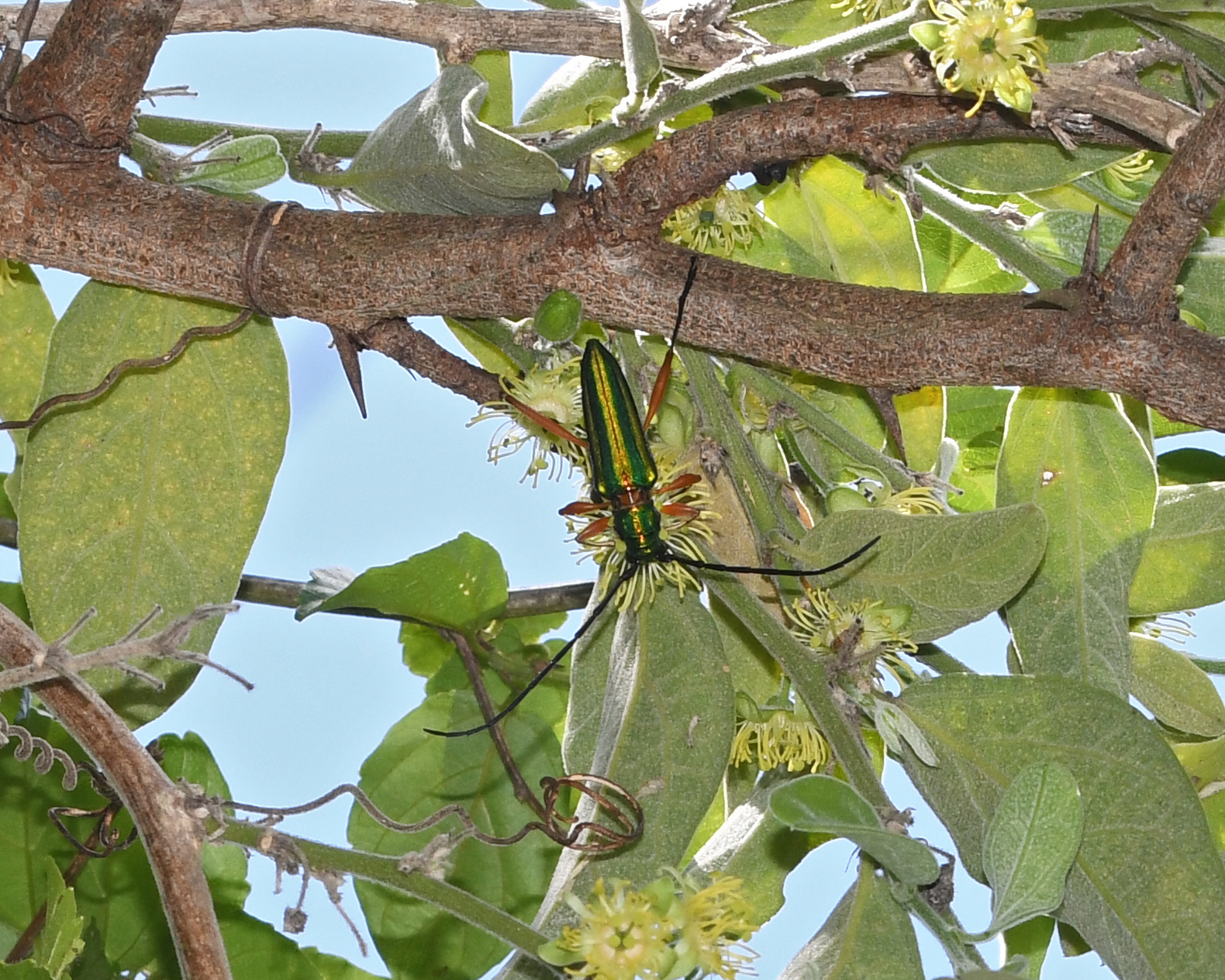
- Mionochroma vittatum, Dominican Republic

Scientific classification
- Domain: Eukaryota
- Kingdom: Animalia
- Phylum: Arthropoda
- Class: Insecta
- Order: Coleoptera
- Suborder: Polyphaga
- Infraorder: Cucujiformia
- Family: Cerambycidae
- Genus: Mionochroma
- Species: M. vittatum

Binomial name
- Mionochroma vittatum (Fabricius, 1775)

Synonyms
- Callichroma assimilatum Lacordaire, 1869; Callichroma rugicolle Gemminger & Harold, 1872; Callichroma rugicollis Bates, 1885; Callichroma scitulum Pascoe, 1866; Callichroma vittata Günther, 1940; Callichroma vittata vittata Zajciw, 1958; Callichroma vittatum Silva, 1967; Callichroma vittatum rufiventris Schmidt, 1924; Callichroma vittatum vittatum Zajciw, 1967; Callichroma vittatus Lacordaire, 1869; Cerambix vittatus Olivier, 1795; Cerambyx ochropus Voet, 1806; Cerambyx vittatus Olivier, 1790; Ceramryx vittatus Fabricius, 1787; Leptura aurea Gmelin, 1790; Leptura viridi-aurea Degeer, 1775; Mionochroma vittata Chemsak, Linsley & Noguera, 1992; Mionochroma vittata vittata Maes et al., 1994

= Mionochroma vittatum =

Species of beetle

Mionochroma vittatum is a species of beetle in the family Cerambycidae. It was described by Johan Christian Fabricius in 1775. It is known from Mexico and central Brazil.
