= Zonopteroides =

Scientific classification
- Kingdom: Animalia
- Phylum: Arthropoda
- Class: Insecta
- Order: Coleoptera
- Suborder: Polyphaga
- Infraorder: Cucujiformia
- Family: Cerambycidae
- Subfamily: Cerambycinae
- Tribe: Callichromatini
- Genus: Zonopteroides; Podaný, 196
- Species: Z. diversus

Binomial name
- Zonopteroides diversus (Gahan, 1906)

Synonyms
- Zonopterus diversus Gahan, 1906

Species of beetle

Zonopteroides diversus is a species of longhorn beetle endemic to Sri Lanka. It is the only species in the genus Zonopteroides.
