= Xystochroma neglectum =

Scientific classification
- Kingdom: Animalia
- Phylum: Arthropoda
- Class: Insecta
- Order: Coleoptera
- Suborder: Polyphaga
- Infraorder: Cucujiformia
- Family: Cerambycidae
- Genus: Xystochroma
- Species: X. neglectum

Binomial name
- Xystochroma neglectum (Gounelle, 1911)

Synonyms
- Xystochroma equestriforme (Schmidt, 1924); Xystochroma roeri Podany, 1965

Species of beetle

Xystochroma neglectum is a species of beetle in the family Cerambycidae. It was described by Gounelle in 1911.
