= Xystochroma clypeatum =

Scientific classification
- Kingdom: Animalia
- Phylum: Arthropoda
- Class: Insecta
- Order: Coleoptera
- Suborder: Polyphaga
- Infraorder: Cucujiformia
- Family: Cerambycidae
- Genus: Xystochroma
- Species: X. clypeatum

Binomial name
- Xystochroma clypeatum (Schwarzer, 1923)

Species of beetle

Xystochroma clypeatum is a species of beetle in the family Cerambycidae. It was described by Schwarzer in 1923.
