= Xystochroma chloropus =

Scientific classification
- Kingdom: Animalia
- Phylum: Arthropoda
- Class: Insecta
- Order: Coleoptera
- Suborder: Polyphaga
- Infraorder: Cucujiformia
- Family: Cerambycidae
- Genus: Xystochroma
- Species: X. chloropus

Binomial name
- Xystochroma chloropus (Bates, 1879)

Species of beetle

Xystochroma chloropus is a species of beetle in the family Cerambycidae. It was described by Henry Walter Bates in 1879.
