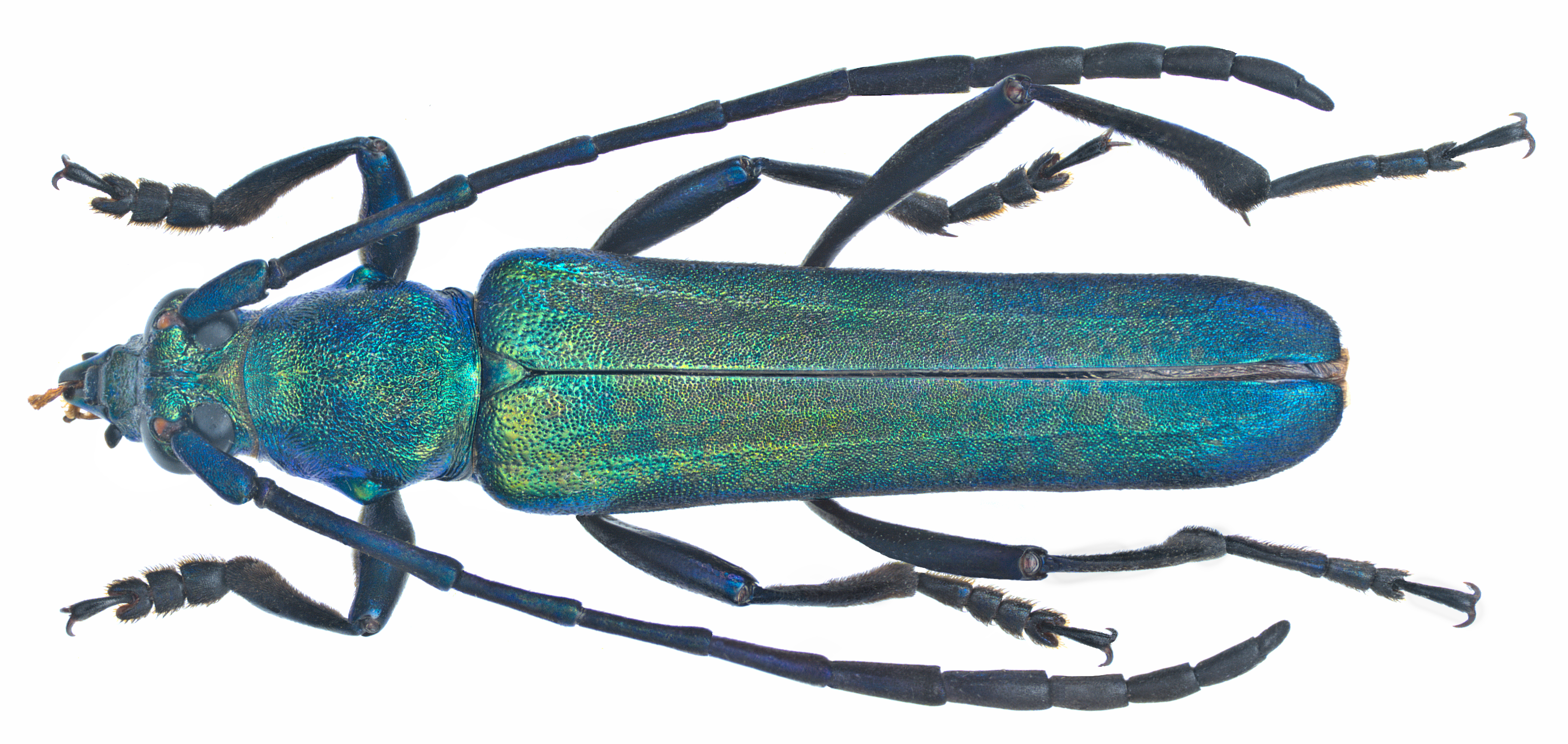
- Polyzonus prasinus

Scientific classification
- Kingdom: Animalia
- Phylum: Arthropoda
- Class: Insecta
- Order: Coleoptera
- Suborder: Polyphaga
- Infraorder: Cucujiformia
- Family: Cerambycidae
- Tribe: Callichromatini
- Genus: Polyzonus; Dejean, 1835

= Polyzonus =

Genus of beetles

Polyzonus is a genus of long-horned beetles. About 35 species have been described in this genus and they are distributed in the Indomalayan Realm.

An incomplete and unverified list of species names described under the genus include:

- Polyzonus (Polyzonides) obtusus Bates, 1879
- Polyzonus (Striatopolyzonus) flavocinctus Gahan, 1894
- Polyzonus (Striatopolyzonus) nitidicollis Pic, 1932
- Polyzonus (Striatopolyzonus) tetraspilotus (Hope, 1835)
- Polyzonus barclayi Skale, 2018
- Polyzonus bhumiboli Skale, 2018
- Polyzonus bizonatus White, 1853
- Polyzonus brevipes Gahan, 1906
- Polyzonus coeruleus (Gressitt & Rondon, 1970)
- Polyzonus deliensis (Bentanachs, 2011)
- Polyzonus democraticus Lameere, 1890
- Polyzonus drumonti Bentanachs, 2011
- Polyzonus flavovirens (Gressitt & Rondon, 1970)
- Polyzonus hartmanni Skale, 2018
- Polyzonus hefferni Vives, Bentanachs & Chew Kea Foo, 2008
- Polyzonus inae Skale, 2018
- Polyzonus jaegeri Skale, 2018
- Polyzonus jakli (Bentanachs & Drouin, 2013)
- Polyzonus latefasciatus Hüdepohl, 1998
- Polyzonus laurae Fairmaire, 1887
- Polyzonus pakxensis Gressitt & Rondon, 1970
- Polyzonus prasinus (White, 1853)
- Polyzonus saigonensis Bates, 1879
- Polyzonus siamensis (Podaný, 1974)
- Polyzonus sinensis (Hope, 1843)
- Polyzonus subtruncatu (Bates, 1879)
- Polyzonus trocolii Bentanachs, 2012
- Polyzonus yunnanus (Podaný, 1974)
