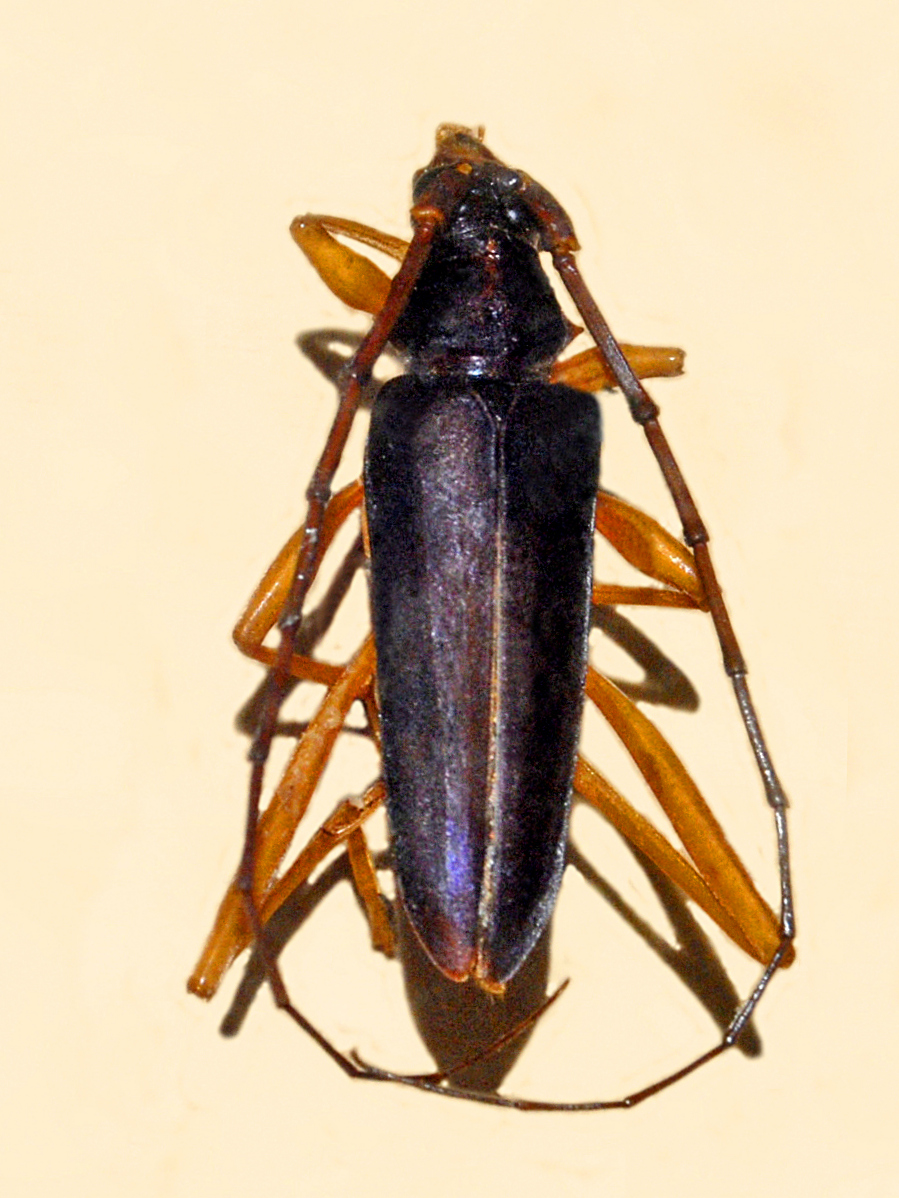
- Chromalizus fragrans

Scientific classification
- Kingdom: Animalia
- Phylum: Arthropoda
- Class: Insecta
- Order: Coleoptera
- Suborder: Polyphaga
- Infraorder: Cucujiformia
- Family: Cerambycidae
- Subfamily: Cerambycinae
- Tribe: Callichromatini
- Genus: Chromalizus; Schmidt, 1922

= Chromalizus =

Genus of beetle

Chromalizus is a genus of beetle in the family Cerambycidae.

== Species ==
- Chromalizus basaloides Lepesme, 1950
- Chromalizus fragrans (Dalman, 1817)
- Chromalizus rugosus (Aurivillius, 1912)
- Chromalizus sjoestedti (Aurivillius, 1903)
- Chromalizus speciosus (Guérin-Méneville, 1844)
- Chromalizus subfragrans Lepesme & Breuning, 1955
- Chromalizus truncatiscapus Lepesme, 1950
- Chromalizus afer (Linnaeus, 1771)
- Chromalizus afroides Lepesme, 1950
- Chromalizus angolensis Veiga-Ferreira, 1971
- Chromalizus argentipes Juhel & Bentanachs, 2010
- Chromalizus aureovittis (Kolbe, 1893)
- Chromalizus basalis (White, 1853)
- Chromalizus basilewskyi Fuchs, 1974
- Chromalizus calceatus (Aurivillius, 1903)
- Chromalizus dekeyseri Lepesme, 1950
- Chromalizus leucorhaphis (Gerstaecker, 1855)
- Chromalizus procerus Schmidt, 1922
- Chromalizus rhodoscelis (Jordan, 1903)
- Chromalizus simulatus (Chevrolat, 1856)
- Chromalizus socius (Jordan, 1894)
