= Xystochroma gracilipes =

Scientific classification
- Kingdom: Animalia
- Phylum: Arthropoda
- Class: Insecta
- Order: Coleoptera
- Suborder: Polyphaga
- Infraorder: Cucujiformia
- Family: Cerambycidae
- Genus: Xystochroma
- Species: X. gracilipes

Binomial name
- Xystochroma gracilipes (Bates, 1879)

Synonyms
- Xystochroma cuprisuturatum (Zajciw, 1965); Xystochroma planipenne (Schmidt, 1924)

Species of beetle

Xystochroma gracilipes is a species of beetle in the family Cerambycidae. It was described by Bates in 1879.
