= Mionochroma rufitarse =

Scientific classification
- Kingdom: Animalia
- Phylum: Arthropoda
- Class: Insecta
- Order: Coleoptera
- Suborder: Polyphaga
- Infraorder: Cucujiformia
- Family: Cerambycidae
- Genus: Mionochroma
- Species: M. rufitarse

Binomial name
- Mionochroma rufitarse (Schwarzer, 1929)

Synonyms
- Callichroma rufitarsis Schwarzer, 1929

Species of beetle

Mionochroma rufitarse is a species of beetle in the family Cerambycidae. It was described by Schwarzer in 1929. It is known from Bolivia.
