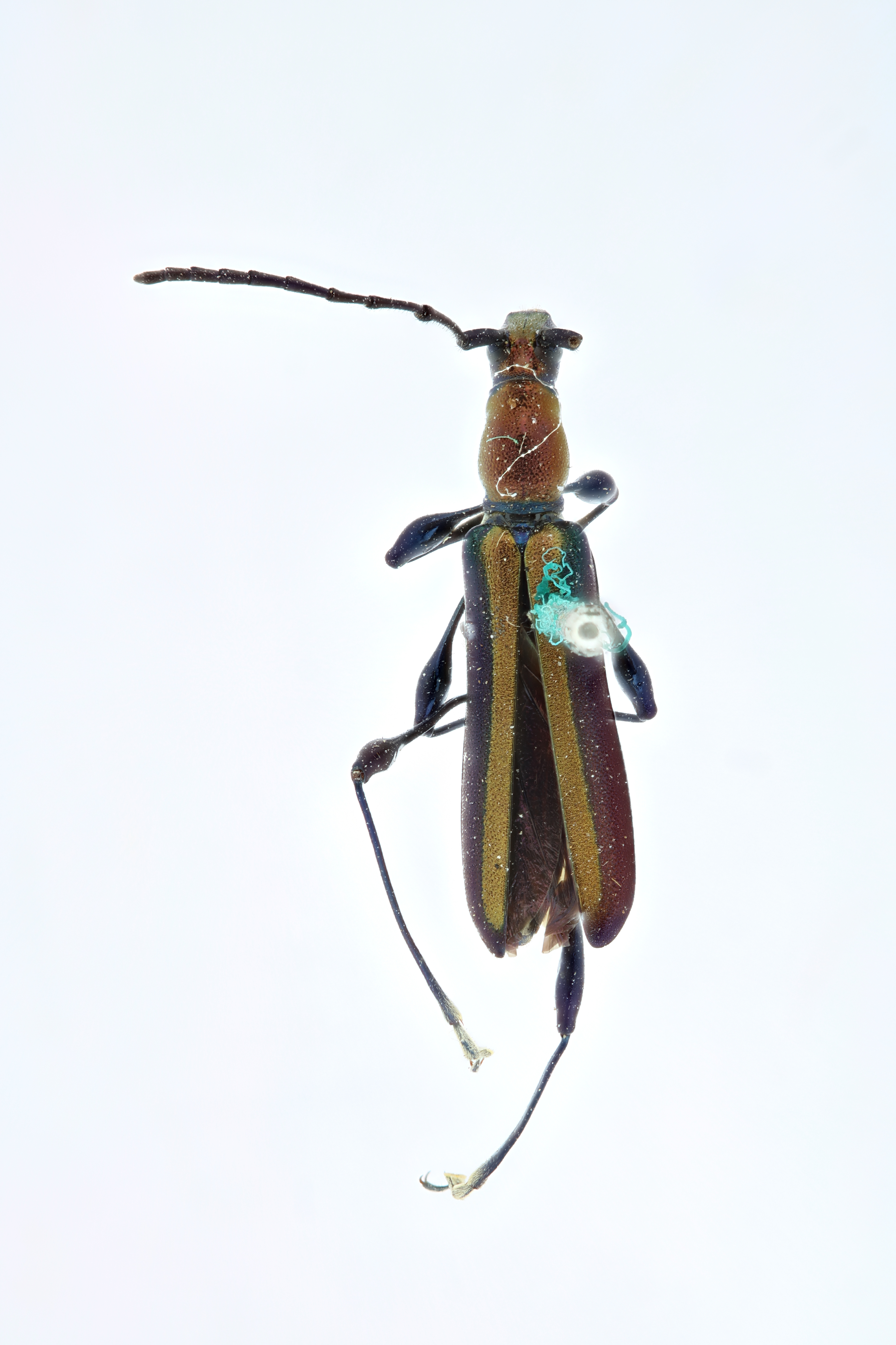
- Euporus cupreifrons

Scientific classification
- Kingdom: Animalia
- Phylum: Arthropoda
- Clade: Pancrustacea
- Class: Insecta
- Order: Coleoptera
- Suborder: Polyphaga
- Infraorder: Cucujiformia
- Family: Cerambycidae
- Subfamily: Cerambycinae
- Genus: Euporus; Audinet-Serville, 1834

Species
- See text.

= Euporus =

Genus of beetles

Euporus is a genus of beetles belonging to the large subfamily Cerambycinae in the family of longhorn beetles (Cerambycidae).

== Appearance ==
Medium-sized, slender and long-legged, usually shiny and metallic longhorn beetle. The head is slightly snout-shaped and elongated. The antennae are usually longer than the body, and rather thin. The pronotum is rounded without teeth on the sides. The coverts are almost evenly wide. The hind legs are particularly long, the thighs thickened at the tip.

== Life cycle ==
The larvae develop in the wood of deciduous trees.

== Prevalence ==
The genus is widespread in Africa.

== Systematic division ==
- Order Beetle, Coleoptera Linnaeus, 1758
  - Suborder Polyphaga Emery, 1886
    - group (infraorder) Cucujiformia Lameere, 1938
      - Superfamily Chrysomeloidea Latreille, 1802 (=Phytophaga)
        - Family longhorn beetles, Cerambycidae Latreille, 1802
          - Subfamily Cerambycinae Latreille, 1802
            - Tribe Callichromatini Blanchard, 1845
              - Genus Euporus Audinet-Serville, 1834
                - Subgenus Euporus
                  - Euporus abyssinicus Müller, 1939
                  - Euporus amabilis Hope, 1843
                  - Euporus dubius Schmidt, 1922
                  - Euporus gracilis Hintz, 1919
                  - Euporus illaesicollis Quedenfeldt, 1883
                  - Euporus itimbirensis Duvivier, 1891
                  - Euporus katanganus Burgeon, 1931
                  - Euporus laevis Schmidt, 1922
                  - Euporus linearis Schmidt, 1922
                  - Euporus liobasis (Bates, 1879)
                  - Euporus pygmaeus Schmidt, 1922
                  - Euporus similis Jordan, 1894
                  - Euporus strangulatus Audinet-Serville, 1834
                  - Euporus torquatus (Dalman, 1817)
                - Subgenus Hintziellus Schmidt, 1922
                  - Euporus nasutus Quedenfeldt, 1882
                  - Euporus plagiatus (Dalman, 1817)
                - Subgenus Meporus Schmidt, 1922
                  - Euporus kuntzeni Schmidt, 1922
                - Subgenus Sphaleroporus Schmidt, 1922
                  - Euporus amethystinus Quedenfeldt, 1882
                  - Euporus conradtiellus Kolbe, 1894
                  - Euporus crucifer Schmidt, 1922
                  - Euporus cupreifrons (Aurivillius, 1914)
                  - Euporus ignicollis Pascoe, 1864
                  - Euporus partitus Gerstäcker, 1884
                  - Euporus tenellus (Bates, 1879)
