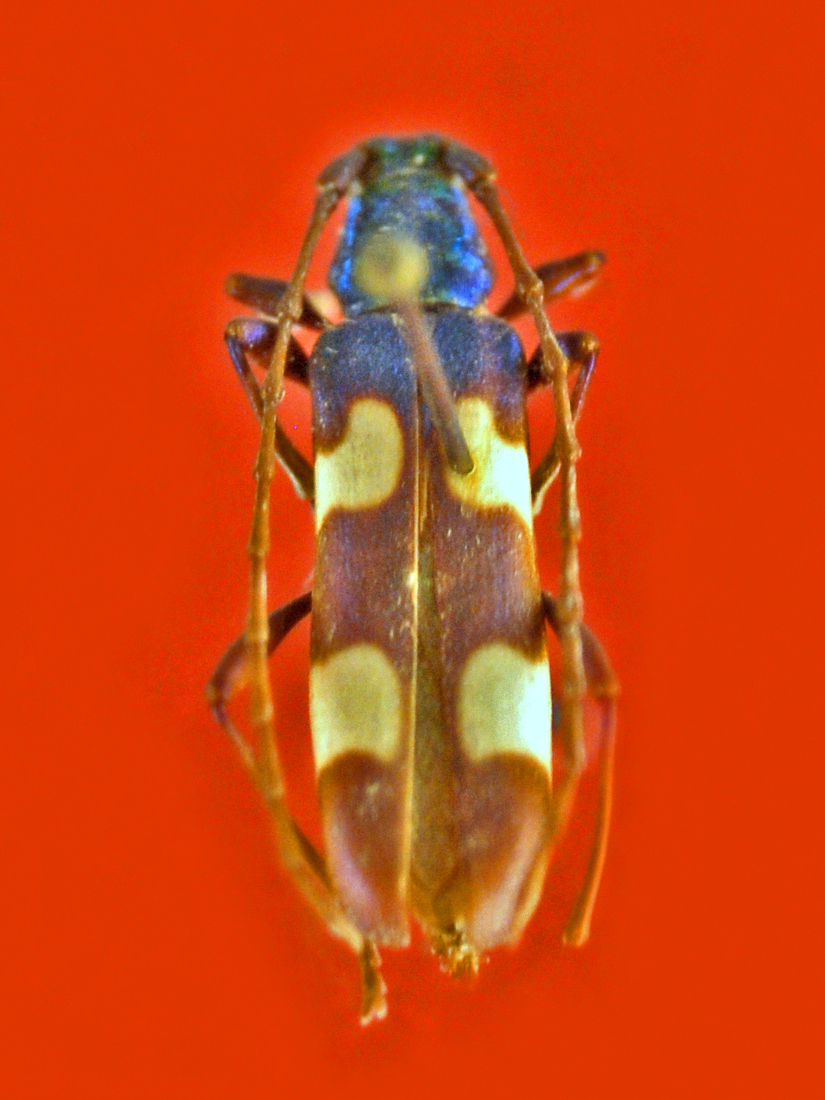
- Anubis subobtusus. Mounted specimen.

Scientific classification
- Kingdom: Animalia
- Phylum: Arthropoda
- Class: Insecta
- Order: Coleoptera
- Suborder: Polyphaga
- Infraorder: Cucujiformia
- Family: Cerambycidae
- Subfamily: Cerambycinae
- Tribe: Callichromatini
- Genus: Anubis; Thomson, 1864

= Anubis (beetle) =

Genus of beetle

Anubis is a genus of longhorn beetles belonging to the family Cerambycidae.

== Species ==
- Anubis bipustulatus Thomson, 1865
- Anubis bohemani Gahan, 1894
- Anubis clavicornis (Fabricius, 1775)
- Anubis curtus Hüdepohl, 1990
- Anubis cyaneicollis (Pic, 1946)
- Anubis cyaneus Pic, 1924
- Anubis dissitus Bates, 1879
- Anubis hexastictus (Fairmaire, 1887)
- Anubis inermis (White, 1853)
- Anubis leptissimus Gressitt & Rondon, 1970
- Anubis manillarum (Chevrolat, 1838)
- Anubis mellyii (White, 1853)
- Anubis methneri Schmidt, 1922
- Anubis pubicollis (Pascoe, 1863)
- Anubis rostratus Bates, 1879
- Anubis scalaris (Pascoe, 1863)
- Anubis striatus (Gressitt & Rondon, 1970)
- Anubis subobtusus (Pic, 1932)
- Anubis suturalis Schwarzer, 1930
- Anubis umtaliensis Schmidt, 1922
- Anubis unifasciatus Bates, 1879
- Anubis viridicollis Pic, 1932
- Anubis vittatus Schmidt, 1922
