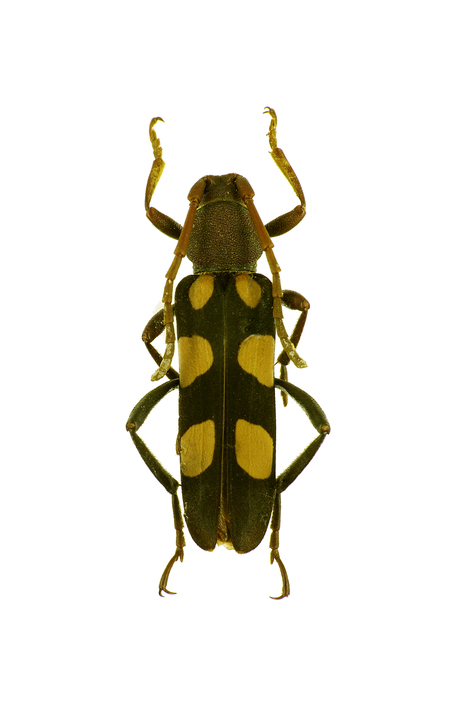
- Xanthospila flavoplagiata

Scientific classification
- Kingdom: Animalia
- Phylum: Arthropoda
- Class: Insecta
- Order: Coleoptera
- Suborder: Polyphaga
- Infraorder: Cucujiformia
- Family: Cerambycidae
- Tribe: Callichromatini
- Genus: Xanthospila; Fairmaire, 1884

= Xanthospila =

Genus of beetles

Xanthospila is a genus of round-necked longhorn beetles of the subfamily Cerambycinae. The type species is Xanthospila flavoplagiata.
