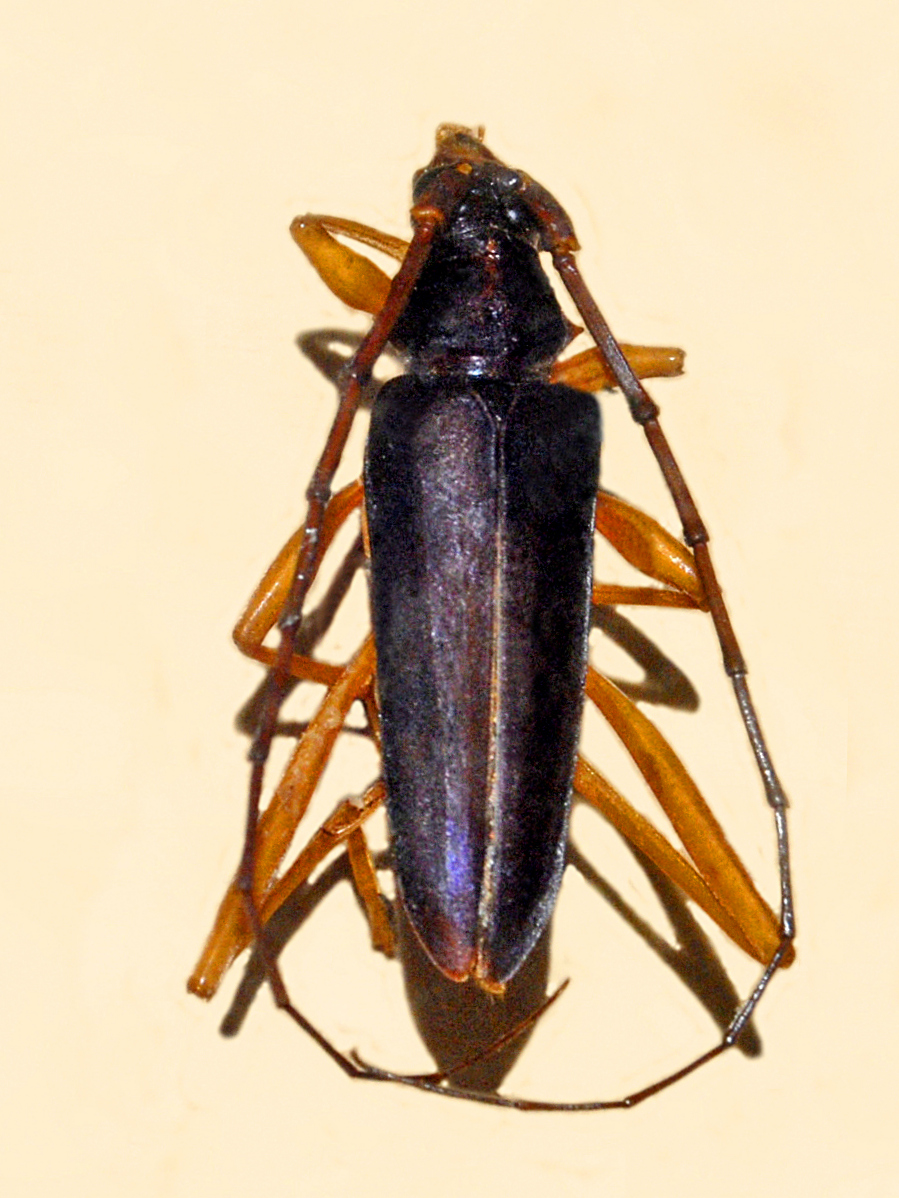
- Chromalizus fragrans cranchii from São Tomé and Príncipe. Museum specimen

Scientific classification
- Kingdom: Animalia
- Phylum: Arthropoda
- Class: Insecta
- Order: Coleoptera
- Suborder: Polyphaga
- Infraorder: Cucujiformia
- Family: Cerambycidae
- Genus: Chromalizus
- Species: C. fragrans

Binomial name
- Chromalizus fragrans (Dalman, 1817)

Synonyms
- Callichroma fragrans Dalman, 1817; Callichroma rufipes Kolbe, 1893; Callichroma virescens Jordan, 1894 (nec Leng, 1886); Chromalizus fragrans nigrotibialis Lepesme & Breuning, 1955; Chromalizus fragrans rossini Lepesme, 1950

= Chromalizus fragrans =

Species of beetle

Chromalizus fragrans is a species of beetle in the family Cerambycidae.

== Subspecies ==
- Chromalizus fragrans conradsi (Aurivillius, 1907)
- Chromalizus fragrans cranchii (White, 1853)
- Chromalizus fragrans fragrans (Dalman, 1817)

== Distribution ==
This species is present in Benin, Cameroon, Democratic Republic of the Congo, Ghana, Republic of the Congo, Sierra Leone, Tanzania and Togo.
