= Xystochroma echinatum =

Scientific classification
- Domain: Eukaryota
- Kingdom: Animalia
- Phylum: Arthropoda
- Class: Insecta
- Order: Coleoptera
- Suborder: Polyphaga
- Infraorder: Cucujiformia
- Family: Cerambycidae
- Genus: Xystochroma
- Species: X. echinatum

Binomial name
- Xystochroma echinatum Napp & Martins, 2005

Species of beetle

Xystochroma echinatum is a species of beetle in the family Cerambycidae. It was described by Napp and Martins in 2005.
