= Rugosochroma =

Scientific classification
- Domain: Eukaryota
- Kingdom: Animalia
- Phylum: Arthropoda
- Class: Insecta
- Order: Coleoptera
- Suborder: Polyphaga
- Infraorder: Cucujiformia
- Family: Cerambycidae
- Subfamily: Cerambycinae
- Tribe: Callichromatini
- Genus: Rugosochroma; Vives & Lin, 2013
- Species: R. yunnanum

Binomial name
- Rugosochroma yunnanum (Vives & Lin, 2013)

Species of beetle

Rugosochroma is a genus of beetles in the family Cerambycidae. It was described by Vives & Lin in 2013 and contains the single species, Rugosochroma yunnanum. It is found in Yunnan, China.
