= Linsleychroma monnei =

Scientific classification
- Kingdom: Animalia
- Phylum: Arthropoda
- Class: Insecta
- Order: Coleoptera
- Suborder: Polyphaga
- Infraorder: Cucujiformia
- Family: Cerambycidae
- Subfamily: Cerambycinae
- Tribe: Callichromatini
- Genus: Linsleychroma
- Species: L. monnei

Binomial name
- Linsleychroma monnei Giesbert, 1998

Genus of beetle

Linsleychroma monnei is a species of longhorned beetle in the family Cerambycidae, found in Panama.
