= Schwarzerium viridescens =

Scientific classification
- Kingdom: Animalia
- Phylum: Arthropoda
- Class: Insecta
- Order: Coleoptera
- Suborder: Polyphaga
- Infraorder: Cucujiformia
- Family: Cerambycidae
- Genus: Schwarzerium
- Species: S. viridescens

Binomial name
- Schwarzerium viridescens Hayashi, 1982

Species of beetle

Schwarzerium viridescens is a species of beetle in the family Cerambycidae. It was described by Hayashi in 1982.
