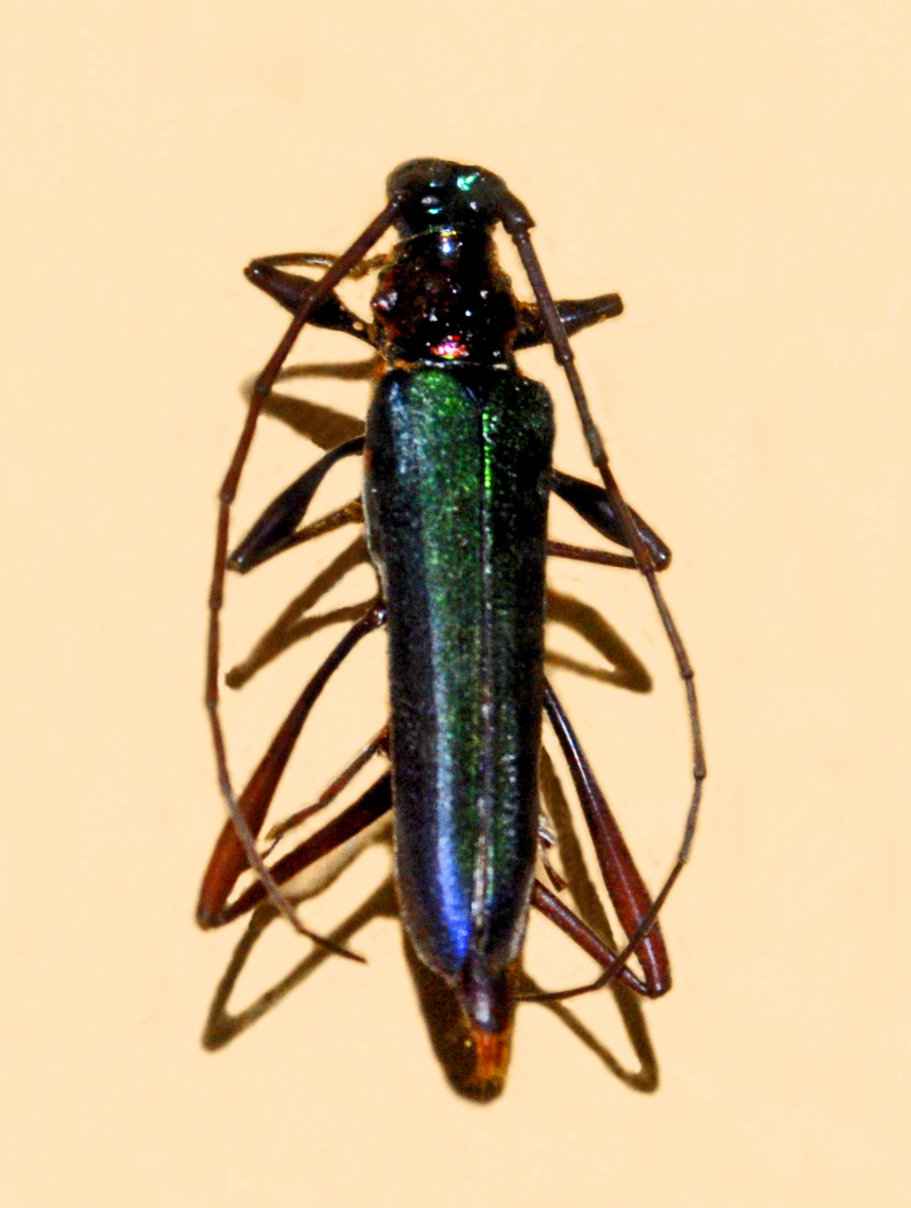
- Chromacilla discoidalis

Scientific classification
- Domain: Eukaryota
- Kingdom: Animalia
- Phylum: Arthropoda
- Class: Insecta
- Order: Coleoptera
- Suborder: Polyphaga
- Infraorder: Cucujiformia
- Family: Cerambycidae
- Tribe: Callichromatini
- Genus: Chromacilla; Schmidt, 1922

= Chromacilla =

Genus of beetle

Chromacilla is a genus of beetles in the family Cerambycidae.

== Species ==
There are 12 recognized species:

- Chromacilla discoidalis (Bates, 1879)
- Chromacilla ducarmei Juhel, 2016
- Chromacilla foveata (Aurivillius, 1913)
- Chromacilla igneicollis (Hope, 1843)
- Chromacilla jossoi Juhel & Bentanachs, 2010
- Chromacilla micans (Fabricius, 1802)
- Chromacilla murphyi Juhel, 2012
- Chromacilla penanhoati Juhel & Bentanachs, 2010
- Chromacilla pujoli Juhel & Bentanachs, 2010
- Chromacilla schubotzi (Hintz, 1911)
- Chromacilla tricolor (Jordan, 1894)
- Chromacilla venus (Thomson, 1858)
