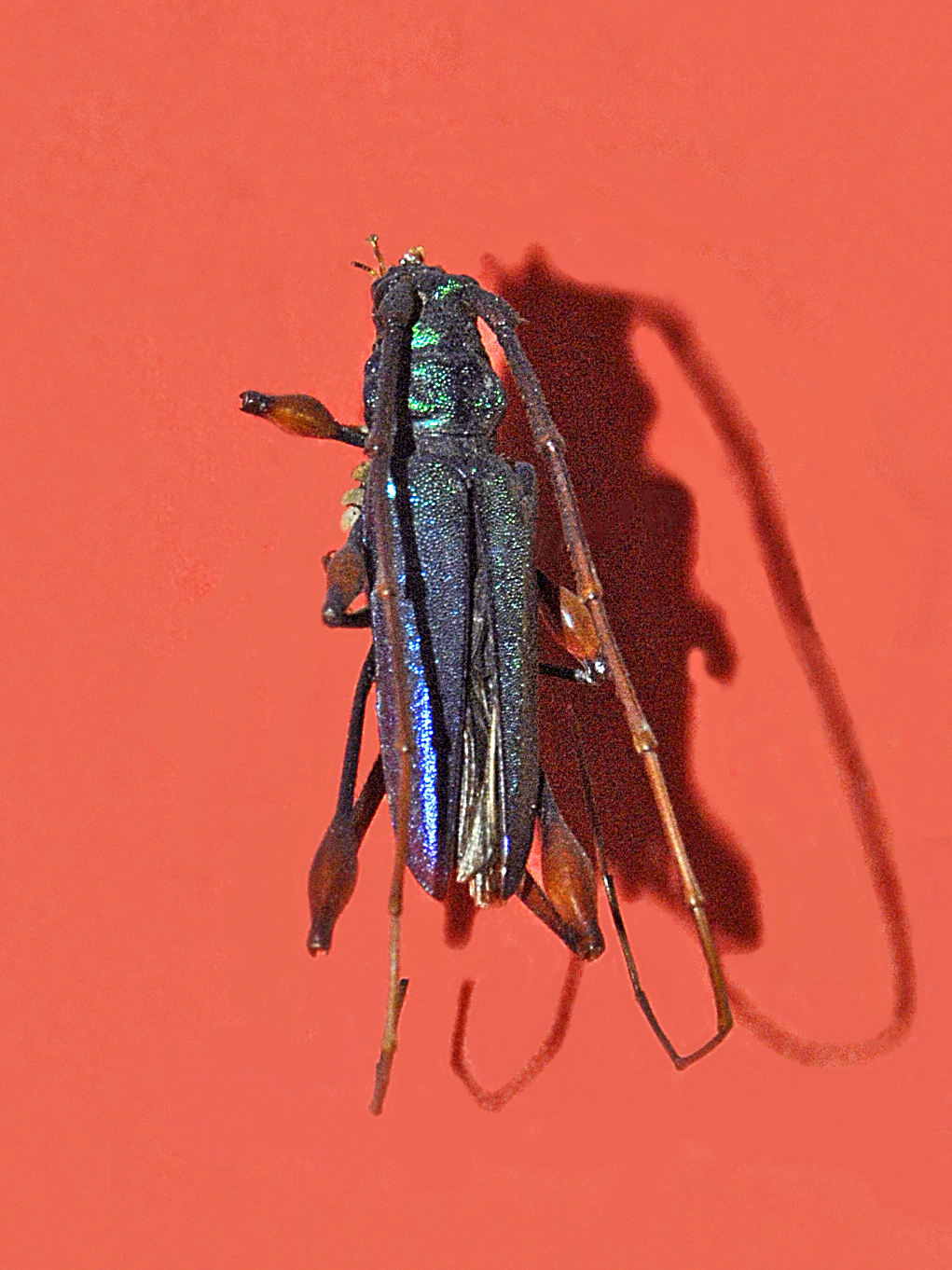
- Museum specimen of Rhopalizus nitens

Scientific classification
- Kingdom: Animalia
- Phylum: Arthropoda
- Class: Insecta
- Order: Coleoptera
- Suborder: Polyphaga
- Infraorder: Cucujiformia
- Family: Cerambycidae
- Genus: Rhopalizus
- Species: R. nitens

Binomial name
- Rhopalizus nitens (Fabricius, 1781)

Synonyms
- Cerambix nitens (Fabricius) Olivier, 1795; Cerambyx nitens Fabricius, 1781; Rhopalizus nitens nitens (Fabricius) Schmidt, 1922

= Rhopalizus nitens =

Species of beetle

Rhopalizus nitens is a species of round-necked longhorn beetles of the subfamily Cerambycinae.

== Subspecies ==
- Rhopalizus nitens clavipes (White, 1853)
- Rhopalizus nitens houyi Schmidt, 1922
- Rhopalizus nitens nigripes (Chevrolat, 1858)

== Description ==
Rhopalizus nitens can reach a body length of about 25 millimetres (0.98 in) in males, of about 20 millimetres (0.79 in) in females. The basic color is blue, with completely black legs in the subspecies Rhopalizus nitens nigripes.

== Distribution ==
This species can be found in Sierra Leone, Liberia, Ivory Coast, Ghana, Togo, Benin, Cameroon, Central Africa, Sudan, Zaire, Equatorial Guinea, Gabon and Democratic Republic of Congo.
