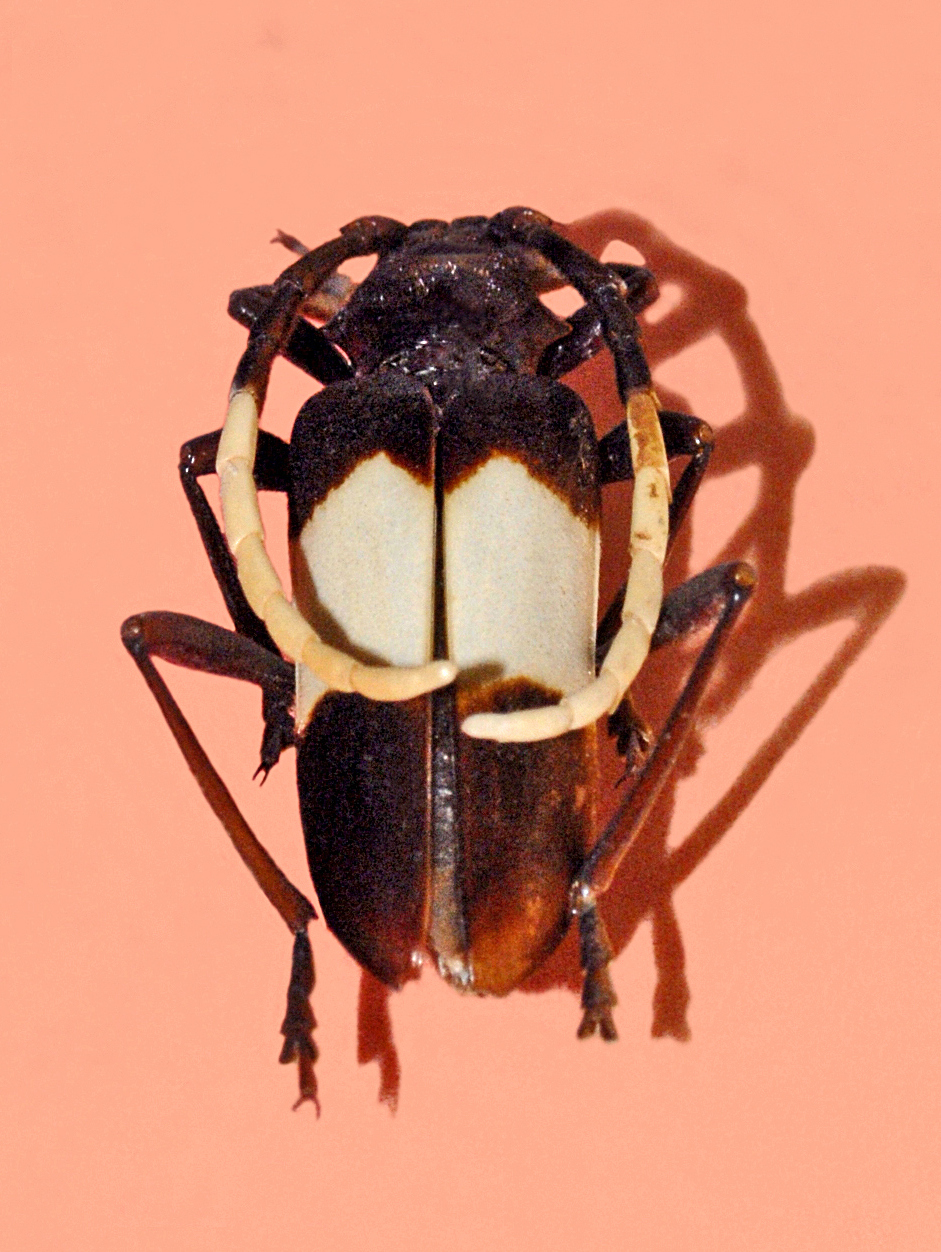
- Museum specimen of Pachyteria dimidiata

Scientific classification
- Domain: Eukaryota
- Kingdom: Animalia
- Phylum: Arthropoda
- Class: Insecta
- Order: Coleoptera
- Suborder: Polyphaga
- Infraorder: Cucujiformia
- Family: Cerambycidae
- Tribe: Callichromatini
- Genus: Pachyteria; Audinet-Serville, 1833

= Pachyteria =

Genus of beetles

Pachyteria is a genus of round-necked longhorn beetles of the subfamily Cerambycinae and tribe Callichromatini.

== Species ==
- Pachyteria basalis Waterhouse, 1878
- Pachyteria calumniata Ritsema, 1890
- Pachyteria chewi Morati & Huet, 2004
- Pachyteria coomani Pic, 1927
- Pachyteria dimidiata Westwood, 1848
- Pachyteria diversipes Ritsema, 1890
- Pachyteria equestris (Newman, 1841)
- Pachyteria fasciata (Fabricius, 1775)
- Pachyteria hageni Ritsema, 1888
- Pachyteria javana Bates, 1879
- Pachyteria kurosawai Niisato, 2001
- Pachyteria lambii Pascoe, 1866
- Pachyteria loebli Morati & Huet, 2004
- Pachyteria melancholica Ritsema, 1909
- Pachyteria narai Hayashi, 1987
- Pachyteria nigra Morati & Huet, 2004
- Pachyteria pasteuri Ritsema, 1892
- Pachyteria pryeri Ritsema, 1888
- Pachyteria ruficollis Waterhouse, 1878
- Pachyteria rugosicollis Ritsema, 1881
- Pachyteria semiplicata Pic, 1927
- Pachyteria semivirescens Hayashi, 1992
- Pachyteria similis Ritsema, 1890
- Pachyteria speciosa Pascoe, 1866
- Pachyteria sumatrana Hüdepohl, 1998
- Pachyteria sumbaensis Hayashi, 1994
- Pachyteria virescens Pascoe, 1866
