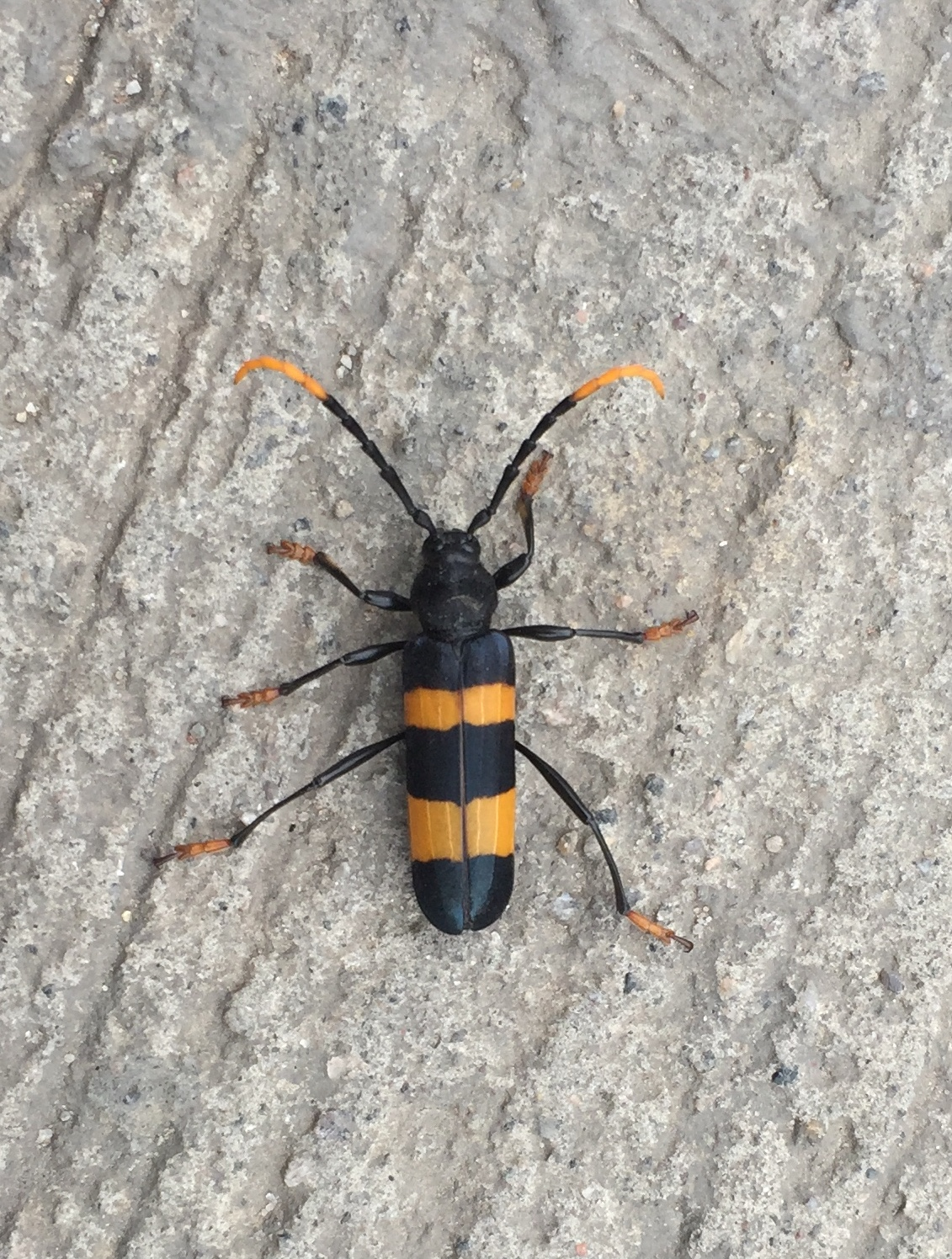
- Zonopterus consanguineus

Scientific classification
- Domain: Eukaryota
- Kingdom: Animalia
- Phylum: Arthropoda
- Class: Insecta
- Order: Coleoptera
- Suborder: Polyphaga
- Infraorder: Cucujiformia
- Family: Cerambycidae
- Tribe: Callichromatini
- Genus: Zonopterus; Hope, 1843

= Zonopterus =

Genus of beetles

Zonopterus is a genus of beetles in the family Cerambycidae. Like most members in the tribe Callichromatini, species in the genus are brightly coloured with bands across the elytra. Most species in the genus are restricted to Southeast Asia with one species occurring in the Western Ghats of South Asia which is closely related to the type species Zonopterus flavitarsis from the eastern Himalayas. The genus was named by Frederick William Hope using the Greek roots ζώνη for belt describing the insect as "belted winged".

Species in the genus include:

- Zonopterus scabricollis Nonfried, 1895
- Zonopterus consanguineus Ritsema, 1889
- Zonopterus corbetti Gahan, 1906
- Zonopterus flavitarsis Hope, 1843
- Zonopterus redemanni Nonfried, 1892
- Zonopterus rugosus Aurivillius, 1922
