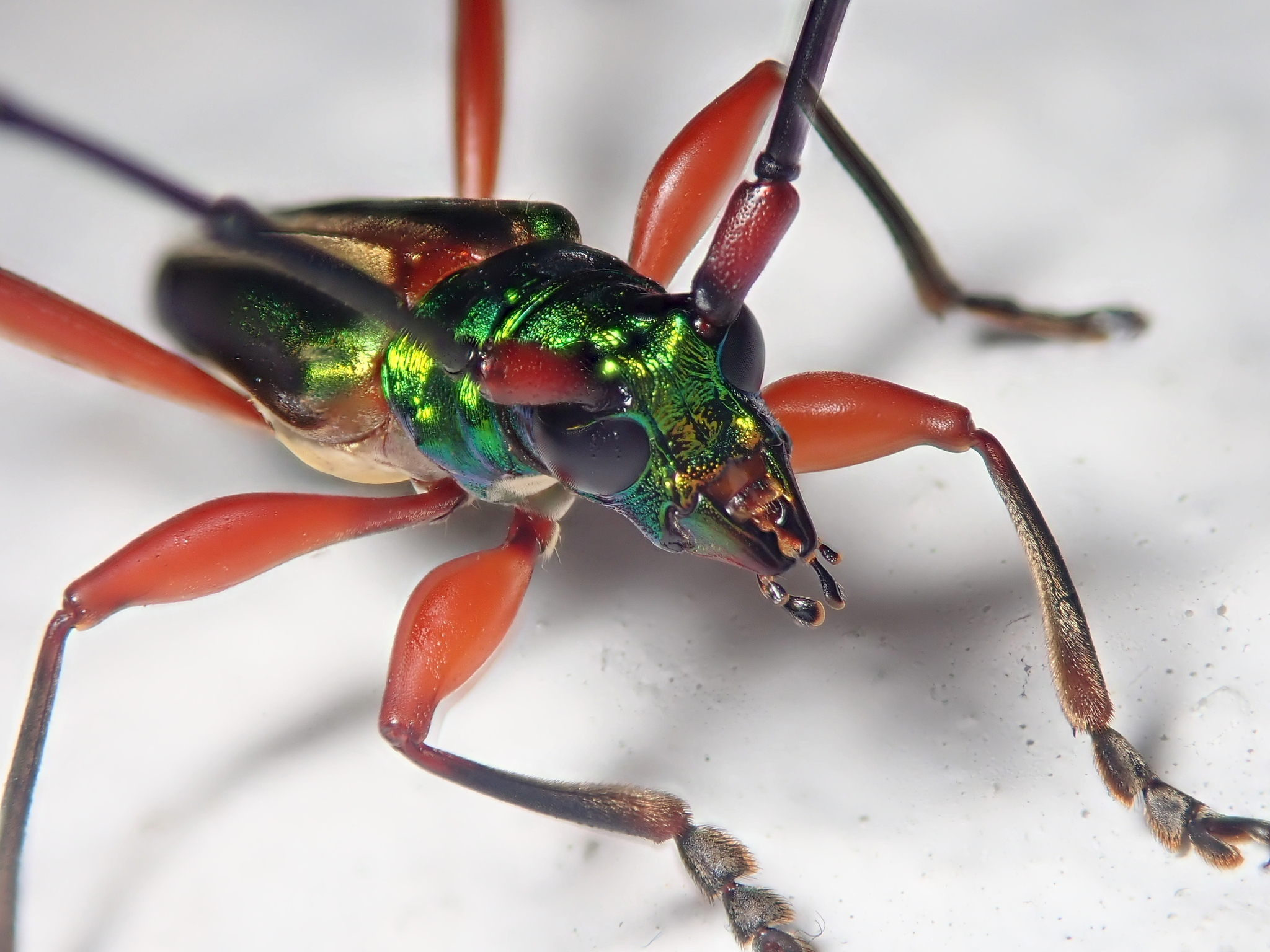
- Mionochroma electrinum, Brasil

Scientific classification
- Domain: Eukaryota
- Kingdom: Animalia
- Phylum: Arthropoda
- Class: Insecta
- Order: Coleoptera
- Suborder: Polyphaga
- Infraorder: Cucujiformia
- Family: Cerambycidae
- Subfamily: Cerambycinae
- Tribe: Callichromatini
- Genus: Mionochroma; Schmidt, 1924

= Mionochroma =

Genus of beetle

Mionochroma is a genus of typical longhorn beetles in the family Cerambycidae. There are more than 20 described species in Mionochroma, found in the Neotropics.

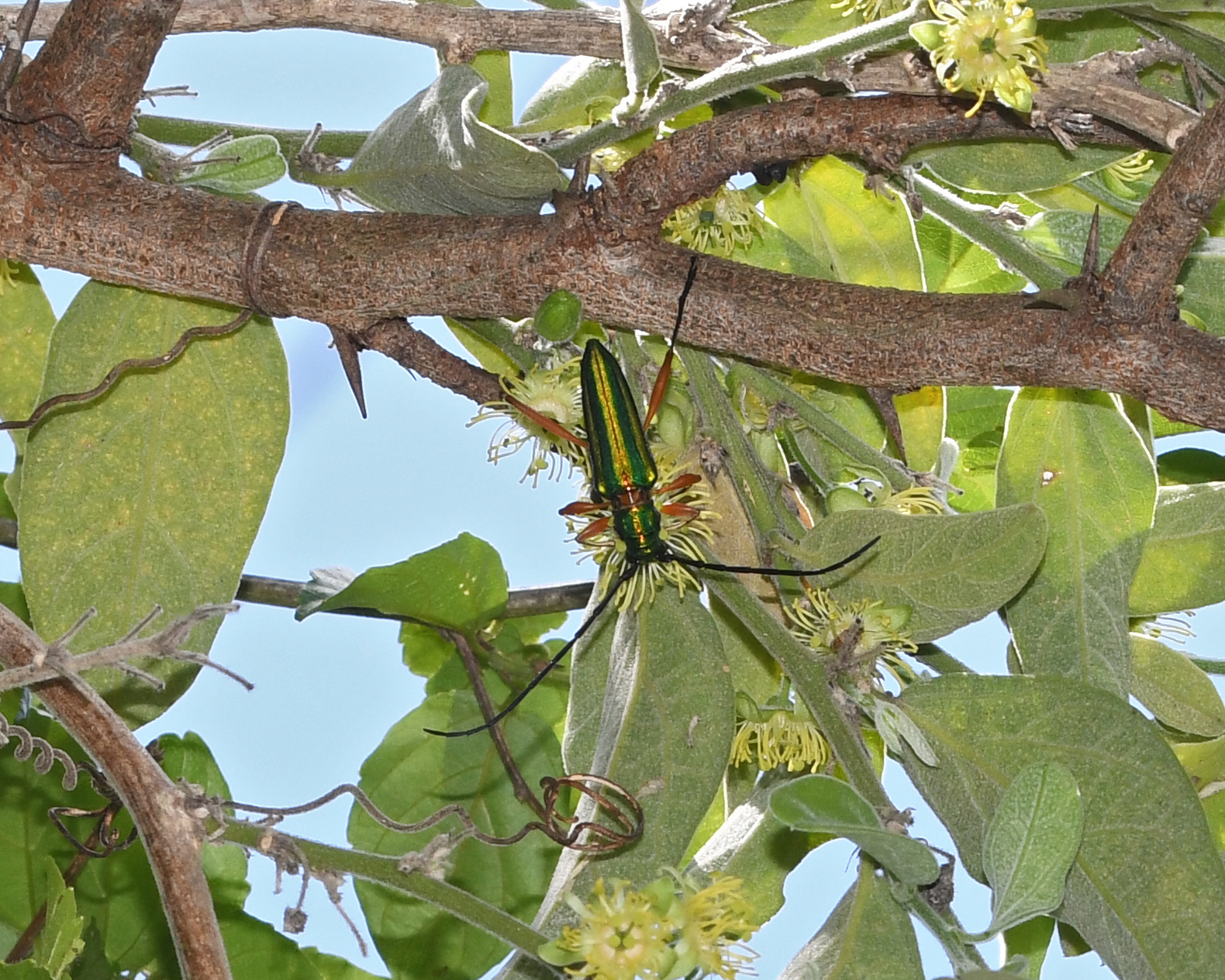
Mionochroma vittatum, Dominican Republic

== Species ==
These 21 species belong to the genus Mionochroma:

- Mionochroma aterrimum (Gounelle, 1911) (Brasil)
- Mionochroma aureotinctum (Bates, 1870) (Guyana, French Guiana, Ecuador, Bolivia, Brasil)
- Mionochroma carmen Napp & Martins, 2009 (Colombia)
- Mionochroma chloe (Gounelle, 1911) (Brasil)
- Mionochroma decipiens (Schmidt, 1924) (Brasil)
- Mionochroma electrinum (Gounelle, 1911) (Argentina, Bolivia, Brasil, Paraguay, Uruguay)
- Mionochroma elegans (Olivier, 1790) (Dominica, Grenada, Guadeloupe, Sainte Lucia)
- Mionochroma equestre (Gounelle, 1911) (Brasil)
- Mionochroma flachi (Schwarzer, 1923) (Brasil)
- Mionochroma guyanense Juhel & Dalens, 2017
- Mionochroma novella (Bates, 1885) (Nicaragua, Panama, Costa Rica)
- Mionochroma ocreatum (Bates, 1870) (Brasil, Ecuador, French Guiana, Péru)
- Mionochroma pseudovittatum (Schwarzer, 1923) (Brasil)
- Mionochroma rufescens (Gahan, 1895) (the Caribbean, Mexico)
- Mionochroma rufitarsis (Schwarzer, 1929) (Bolivie)
- Mionochroma spinosissimum (Schmidt, 1924) (Péru)
- Mionochroma subaurosum (Zajciw, 1966) (Bolivie, Péru)
- Mionochroma subnitescens (Gounelle, 1911) (Brasil)
- Mionochroma tavakiliani Juhel & Dalens, 2017
- Mionochroma vittatum (Fabricius, 1775) (Neotropics)
- Mionochroma wilkei (Schmidt, 1924) (Panama, Ecuador)
