= Schwarzerium =

- Schwarzerium yunnanum

Scientific classification
- Domain: Eukaryota
- Kingdom: Animalia
- Phylum: Arthropoda
- Class: Insecta
- Order: Coleoptera
- Suborder: Polyphaga
- Infraorder: Cucujiformia
- Family: Cerambycidae
- Tribe: Callichromatini
- Genus: Schwarzerium; Matsushita, 1933

Genus of beetles

Schwarzerium is a genus of long-horned beetle.

== Species ==
Schwarzerium contains the following species:

- Schwarzerium andrea Skale, 2021
- Schwarzerium cyaneipes (Pic, 1946)
- Schwarzerium extremum Skale, 2021
- Schwarzerium fansipanense Skale, 2021
- Schwarzerium gerardi Skale, 2021
- Schwarzerium hagiangense Skale, 2021
- Schwarzerium hasuoi Niisato & Bentanachs, 2012
- Schwarzerium holzschuhi Skale, 2021
- Schwarzerium merkli Skale, 2021
- Schwarzerium provostii (Fairmaire, 1887)
- Schwarzerium quadricolle (Bates, 1884)
- Schwarzerium semivelutinum (Schwarzer, 1925)
- Schwarzerium tamdaoense Skale, 2021
- Schwarzerium viridescens Hayashi, 1982
- Schwarzerium viridicyaneum (Hayashi, 1956)
