= Schwarzerium quadricolle =

Scientific classification
- Domain: Eukaryota
- Kingdom: Animalia
- Phylum: Arthropoda
- Class: Insecta
- Order: Coleoptera
- Suborder: Polyphaga
- Infraorder: Cucujiformia
- Family: Cerambycidae
- Genus: Schwarzerium
- Species: S. quadricolle

Binomial name
- Schwarzerium quadricolle (Bates, 1884)

Synonyms
- Chelidonium quadricolle Bates, 1884; Schwarzerium quadricollis

Species of beetle

Schwarzerium quadricolle is a species of beetle in the family Cerambycidae. It was described by Bates in 1884.
