= Schwarzerium viridicyaneum =

Scientific classification
- Kingdom: Animalia
- Phylum: Arthropoda
- Class: Insecta
- Order: Coleoptera
- Suborder: Polyphaga
- Infraorder: Cucujiformia
- Family: Cerambycidae
- Genus: Schwarzerium
- Species: S. viridicyaneum

Binomial name
- Schwarzerium viridicyaneum (Hayashi, 1956)

Species of beetle

Schwarzerium viridicyaneum is a species of beetle in the family Cerambycidae. It was described by Hayashi in 1956.
