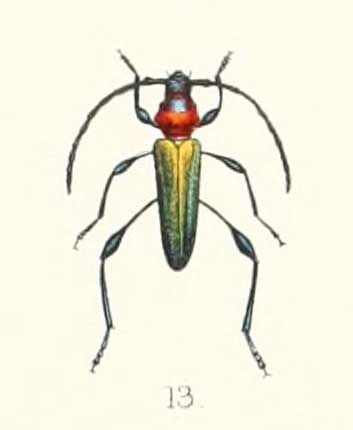
- Eximia colorata

Scientific classification
- Kingdom: Animalia
- Phylum: Arthropoda
- Class: Insecta
- Order: Coleoptera
- Suborder: Polyphaga
- Infraorder: Cucujiformia
- Family: Cerambycidae
- Tribe: Callichromatini
- Genus: Eximia; Jordan, 1894

= Eximia =

Genus of beetle

Eximia is a genus of round-necked longhorn beetles of the subfamily Cerambycinae.

== Species ==
There are four species assigned to this genus:

- Eximia colorata (Quedenfeldt, 1882)
- Eximia finitima Schmidt, 1922
- Eximia sinuaticolle (Thomson, 1858)
- Eximia suturalis (Hintz, 1919)
