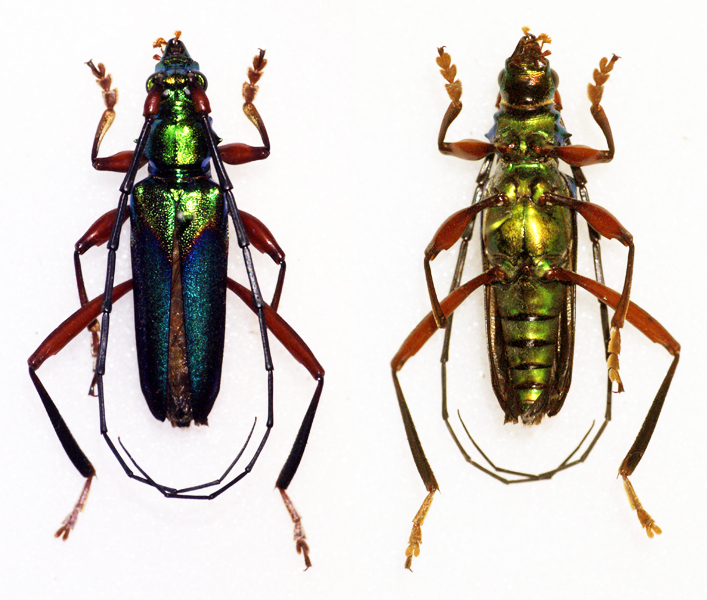

Scientific classification
- Domain: Eukaryota
- Kingdom: Animalia
- Phylum: Arthropoda
- Class: Insecta
- Order: Coleoptera
- Suborder: Polyphaga
- Infraorder: Cucujiformia
- Family: Cerambycidae
- Genus: Philematium
- Species: P. festivum

Binomial name
- Philematium festivum Fabricius, 1775

Synonyms
- Cerambyx festivus Fabricius, 1775; Cerambyx festus Gmelin, 1789; Callichroma festivus Chevrolat, 1861; Philematium festivum Thomson, 1864; Philematium festum Vitali & Rezbanyai-Reser, 2003

= Philematium festivum =

Species of beetle

Philematium festivum is a species of beetle in the family Cerambycidae. It was described by Fabricius in 1775.
