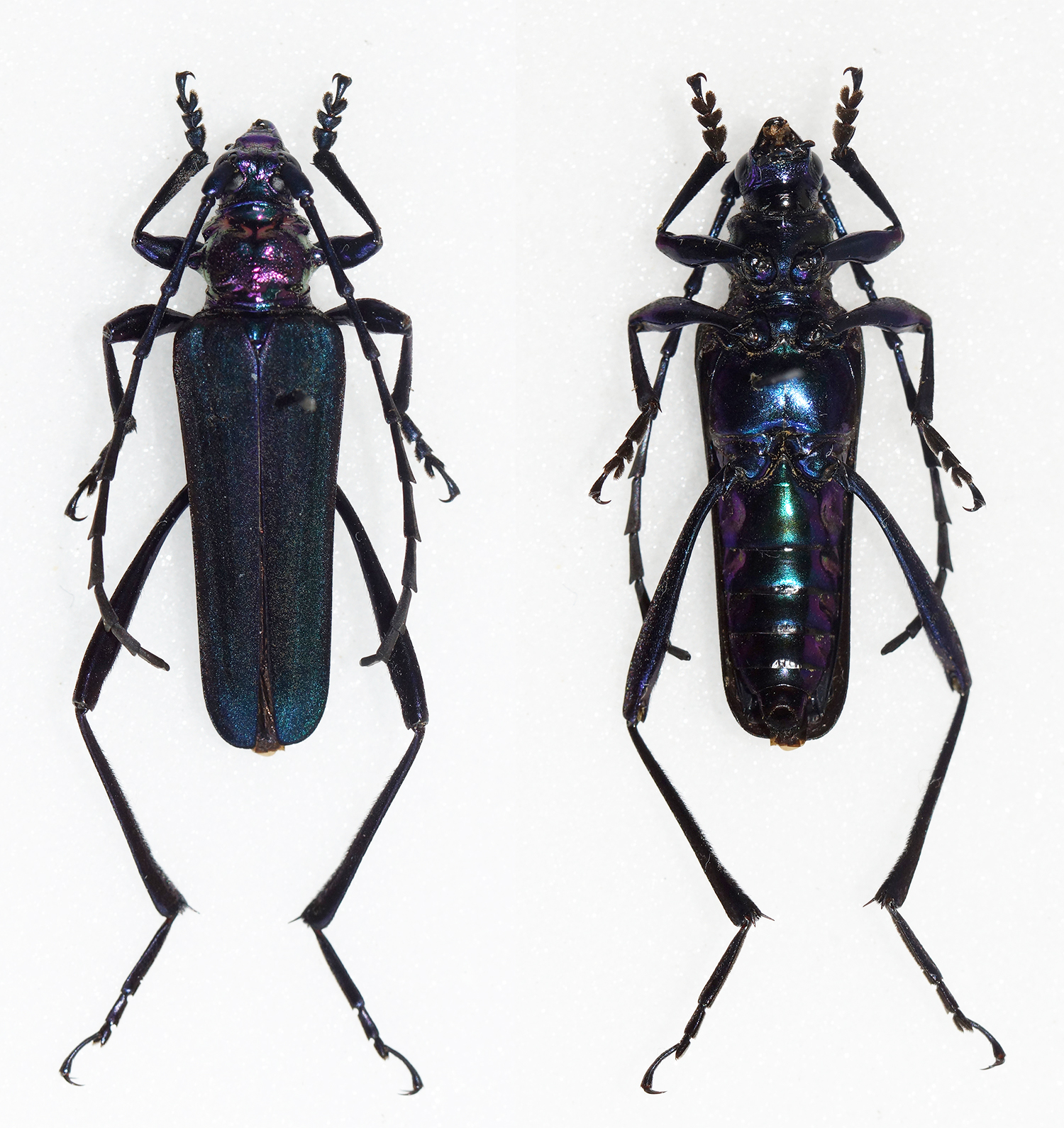

Scientific classification
- Domain: Eukaryota
- Kingdom: Animalia
- Phylum: Arthropoda
- Class: Insecta
- Order: Coleoptera
- Suborder: Polyphaga
- Infraorder: Cucujiformia
- Family: Cerambycidae
- Genus: Schwarzerium
- Species: S. semivelutinum

Binomial name
- Schwarzerium semivelutinum (Schwarzer, 1925)

= Schwarzerium semivelutinum =

Species of beetle

Schwarzerium semivelutinum is a species of beetle in the family Cerambycidae. It was described by Schwarzer in 1925.
