= Xystochroma setigerum =

Scientific classification
- Kingdom: Animalia
- Phylum: Arthropoda
- Class: Insecta
- Order: Coleoptera
- Suborder: Polyphaga
- Infraorder: Cucujiformia
- Family: Cerambycidae
- Genus: Xystochroma
- Species: X. setigerum

Binomial name
- Xystochroma setigerum (Schmidt, 1924)

Species of beetle

Xystochroma setigerum is a species of beetle in the family Cerambycidae. It was described by Schmidt in 1924.
