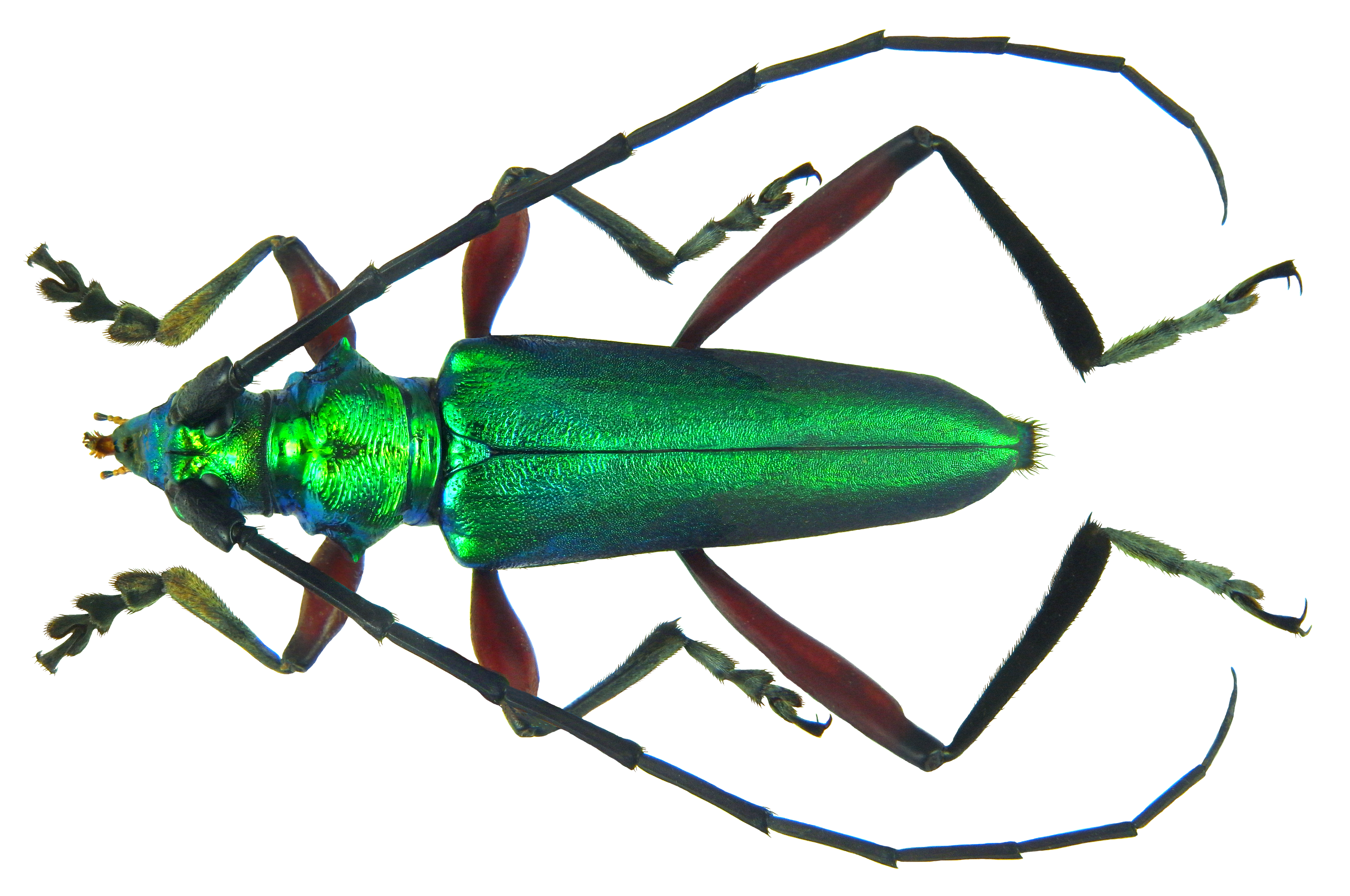
- Philematium virens amphipatris Schmidt, 1922

Scientific classification
- Kingdom: Animalia
- Phylum: Arthropoda
- Class: Insecta
- Order: Coleoptera
- Suborder: Polyphaga
- Infraorder: Cucujiformia
- Family: Cerambycidae
- Genus: Philematium; Thomson, 1864

= Philematium =

Genus of beetles

Philematium is a genus of beetles in the family Cerambycidae.

== Species ==
- Philematium astoboricum
- Philematium calcaratum
- Philematium chromalizoides
- Philematium currori
- Philematium debile
- Philematium femorale
- Philematium festivum
- Philematium ghesquierei
- Philematium greeffi
- Philematium mussardi
- Philematium rugosum
- Philematium swahili
- Philematium virens
