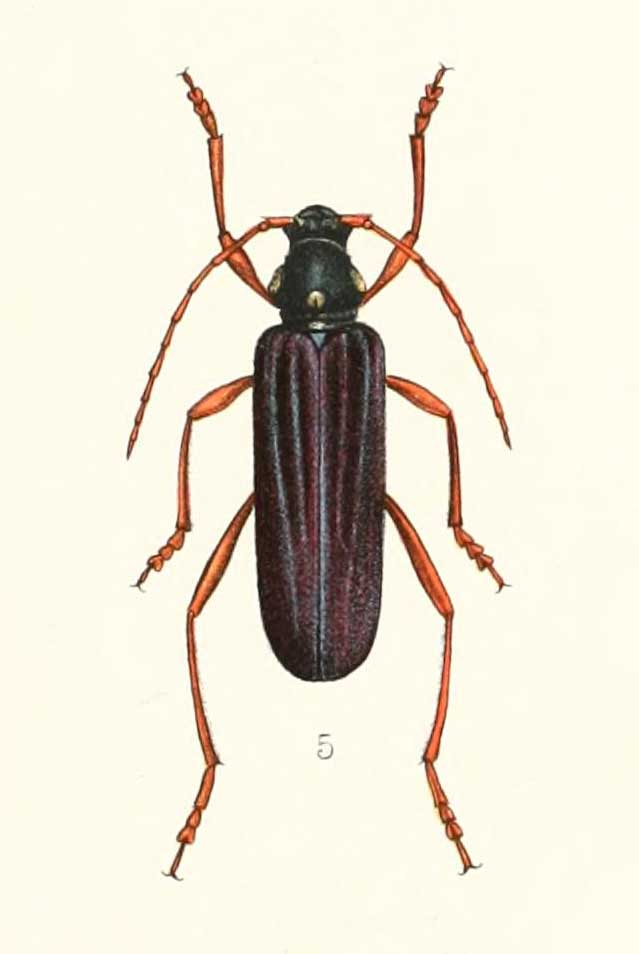
- Dictator regius

Scientific classification
- Domain: Eukaryota
- Kingdom: Animalia
- Phylum: Arthropoda
- Class: Insecta
- Order: Coleoptera
- Suborder: Polyphaga
- Infraorder: Cucujiformia
- Family: Cerambycidae
- Subfamily: Cerambycinae
- Tribe: Callichromatini
- Genus: Dictator; Thomson, 1878

Synonyms
- Omoptycha Quedenfeldt, 1883

= Dictator (beetle) =

Genus of beetle

Dictator is a genus of round-necked longhorn beetles of the subfamily Cerambycinae. They are found in Africa.

== Species ==
These three species belong to the genus Dictator:

- Dictator juheli Delahaye, 2009 (Zambia)
- Dictator orientalis Hintz, 1913 (DR Congo, Tanzania, Zambia)
- Dictator regius (Fabricius, 1801) (Ivory Coast, Guinea, Nigeria, Sierra Leone, Togo)
