= Führer (disambiguation) =

Führer is a German word meaning 'leader' or 'guide'. As a political title, it is strongly associated with Adolf Hitler, the dictator of Germany from 1933 to 1945.

Führer, Fuhrer or Fuehrer may also refer to:

== People with the name ==
- Alois Anton Führer (1853–1930), a German Indologist
- Bruce A. Fuhrer (1930–2023), an Australian mycologist
- Christian Führer (1943–2014), a German pastor and leading figures of the Peaceful East German revolution 1989
- Robert Führer (1807–1861), a Czech composer
- Hansruedi Führer (born 1937), a Swiss football player

== Other ==
- Georg Ritter von Schönerer, Austrian antisemite and German nationalist was addressed as Führer by his supporters

== Title ==
- Führer of the National Socialist German Workers' Party

== See also ==
- Der Fuehrer's Face, a 1943 animated short film by Walt Disney Productions, featuring Donald Duck
- The Führer and the Tramp, a 2021 alternate history graphic novel series by Sean McArdle, of Charlie Chaplin fighting Adolf Hitler, while filming The Great Dictator
