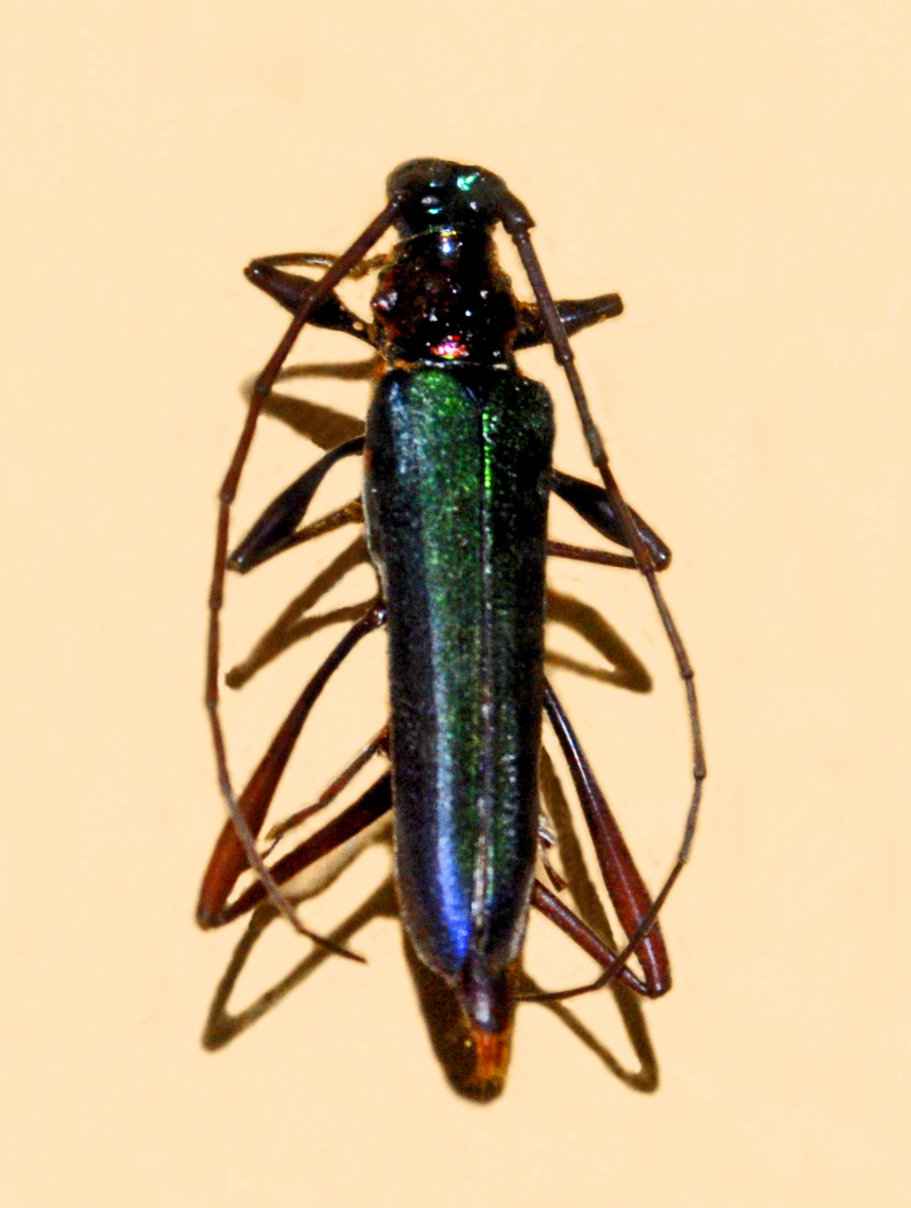
- Chromacilla discoidalis from Bioko. Museum specimen

Scientific classification
- Domain: Eukaryota
- Kingdom: Animalia
- Phylum: Arthropoda
- Class: Insecta
- Order: Coleoptera
- Suborder: Polyphaga
- Infraorder: Cucujiformia
- Family: Cerambycidae
- Genus: Chromacilla
- Species: C. discoidalis

Binomial name
- Chromacilla discoidalis (Bates, 1879)

Synonyms
- Callichroma discoidalis Bates, 1879; Callichroma discoidale Bates, 1879; Chromacilla discoidale (Bates, 1879)

= Chromacilla discoidalis =

Species of beetle

Chromacilla discoidalis is a species of beetle in the family Cerambycidae. It measures 25–34 mm (0.98–1.34 in) in length.

== Subspecies ==
There are two subspecies:

- Chromacilla discoidalis discoidalis (Bates, 1879)
- Chromacilla discoidalis equateurensis Juhel & Bentanachs, 2010

== Distribution ==
This species is present in Benin, Cameroon, Central African Republic, Democratic Republic of the Congo, Republic of the Congo, and Angola.
