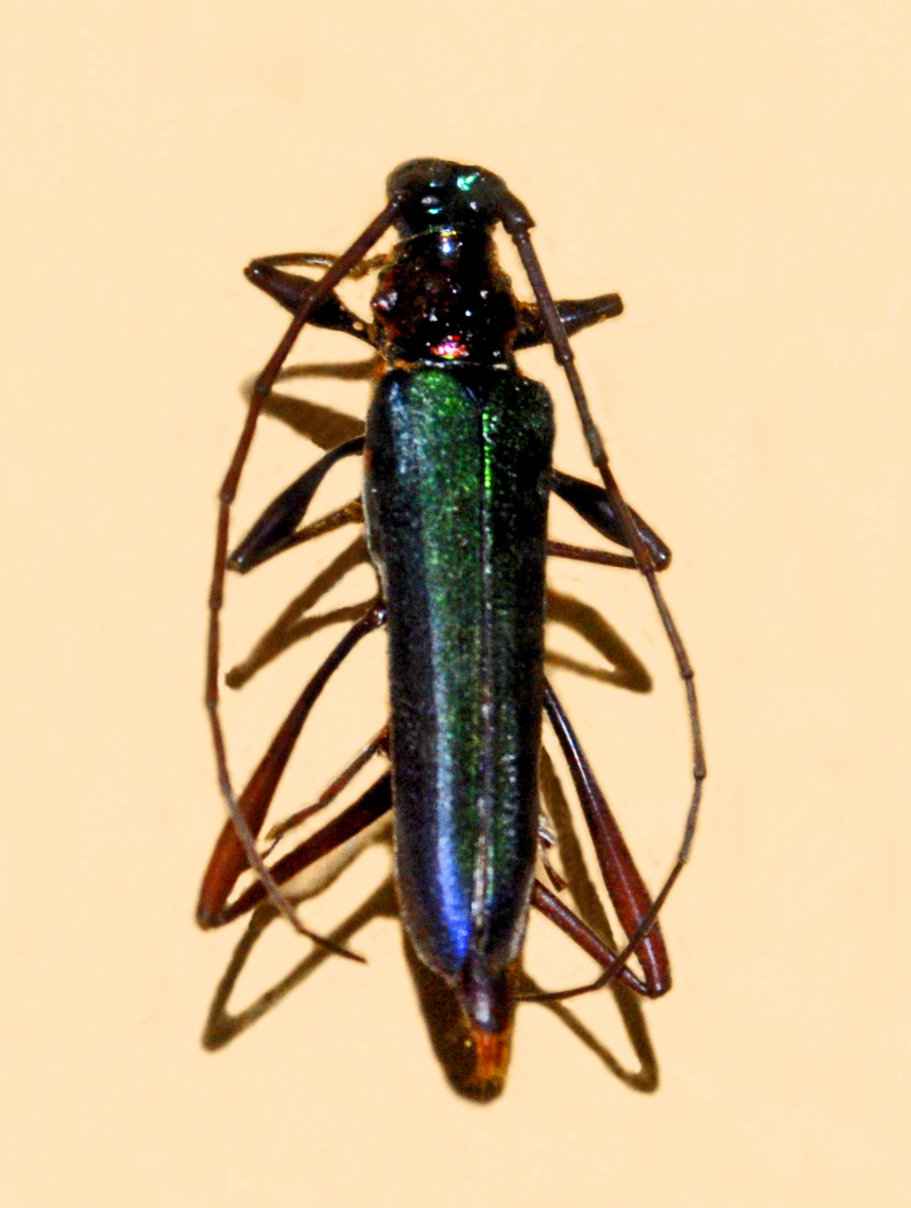
- Chromacilla discoidalis

Scientific classification
- Kingdom: Animalia
- Phylum: Arthropoda
- Clade: Pancrustacea
- Class: Insecta
- Order: Coleoptera
- Suborder: Polyphaga
- Infraorder: Cucujiformia
- Family: Cerambycidae
- Subfamily: Cerambycinae
- Tribe: Callichromatini; Blanchard, 1845

= Callichromatini =

Tribe of beetle

Callichromatini is a tribe of beetles in the subfamily Cerambycinae, which includes the following genera:

== Genera ==
These 148 genera belong to the tribe Callichromatini:

- Agaleptoides Lepesme, 1956
- Agaleptus Gahan, 1904
- Amblyontium Bates, 1879
- Anexamita Schmidt, 1922
- Anisoceraea Schmidt, 1922
- Anubis Thomson, 1864
- Aphrodisium Thomson, 1864
- Aromia Audinet-Serville, 1833
- Aromiella Podaný, 1971
- Asmedia Pascoe, 1866
- Borneochroma Vives, Bentanachs & Chew, 2008
- Brachyhospes Juhel & Bentanachs, 2012
- Bradycnemis Waterhouse, 1877
- Brevechelidonium Vives, Bentanachs & Chew, 2009
- Callichroma Latreille, 1817
- Cataphrodisium Aurivillius, 1907
- Cephalizus Schmidt, 1922
- Chelidonium Thomson, 1864 (Celandine)
- Chewchroma Bentanachs & Vives, 2009
- Chloridolum Thomson, 1864
- Chromacilla Schmidt, 1922
- Chromalizus Schmidt, 1922
- Clavomela Adlbauer, 2000
- Cloniophorus Quedenfeldt, 1882
- Closteromerus Dejean, 1835
- Cnemidochroma Schmidt, 1924
- Colobizus Schmidt, 1922
- Compsomera White, 1853
- Conamblys Schmidt, 1922
- Cotychroma Martins & Napp, 2005
- Crassichroma Vives, Bentanachs & Chew, 2009
- Ctenomaeus Schmidt, 1922
- Cycloclonius Schmidt, 1922
- Dictator Thomson, 1878
- Dolichaspis Gahan, 1890
- Dubianella Morati & Huet, 2004
- Embrikstrandia Plavilstshikov, 1931
- Erythroclea Aurivillius, 1914
- Eugoides Aurivillius, 1904
- Euporus Audinet-Serville, 1834
- Evgoa Fåhraeus, 1872
- Eximia Jordan, 1894
- Exoparyphus Schmidt, 1922
- Gauresthes Bates, 1889
- Gestriana Podaný, 1971
- Gressittichroma Vives, Bentanachs & Chew, 2009
- Griphapex Jordan, 1894
- Guitelia Oberthür, 1911
- Hadromastix Schmidt, 1922
- Hayashichroma Vives, Bentanachs & Chew, 2008
- Helymaeus Thomson, 1864
- Hexamitodera Heller, 1896
- Hintziellus Schmidt, 1922
- Hoplomeces Aurivillius, 1916
- Hosmaeus Juhel, 2011
- Hospes Jordan, 1894
- Huedepohliana Heffern, 2002
- Hybunca Schmidt, 1922
- Hypargyra Gahan, 1890
- Hypatium Thomson, 1864
- Hypocrites Fåhraeus, 1872
- Ipothalia Pascoe, 1867
- Jonthodes Audinet-Serville, 1833
- Jonthodina Achard, 1911
- Kipandia Bentanachs & Drouin, 2015
- Laosaphrodisium Bentanachs, 2012
- Leptochroma Vives, 2013
- Leptosiella Morati & Huet, 2004
- Linsleychroma Giesbert, 1998
- Litomeces Murray, 1870
- Litopus Audinet-Serville, 1833
- Luzonochroma Vives, 2012
- Macrosaspis Adlbauer, 2009
- Mattania Fairmaire, 1894
- Mecosaspis Thomson, 1864
- Metallichroma Aurivillius, 1903
- Micromaeus Schmidt, 1922
- Mimochelidonium Bentanachs & Drouin, 2013
- Mionochroma Schmidt, 1924
- Mombasius Bates, 1879
- Monnechroma Napp & Martins, 2005
- Moratichroma Bentanachs, Morati & Vives, 2010
- Namibomeces Adlbauer, 2001
- Neobizus Juhel, 2022
- Neorygocera Hedicke, 1923
- Niisatochroma Vives & Bentanachs, 2010
- Niraeus Newman, 1840
- Nothopygus Lacordaire, 1869
- Odontochroma Vives, 2015
- Oligosmerus Kolbe, 1894
- Orphnodula Schmidt, 1922
- Osphranteria Redtenbacher, 1850
- Otaromia Aurivillius, 1911
- Oxyprosopus Thomson, 1864
- Pachymeces Juhel, 2012
- Pachyteria Audinet-Serville, 1833
- Parachelidonium Vives, Bentanachs & Chew, 2008
- Paracolobizus Juhel, 2011
- Paraguitelia Quentin & Villiers, 1971
- Parandrocephalus Heller, 1916
- Paraphrodisium Bentanachs & Drouin, 2013
- Pelidnopedilon Schmidt, 1922
- Phasganocnema Schmidt, 1922
- Philaphrodisium Jiroux et al., 2022
- Philematium Thomson, 1864
- Philomeces Kolbe, 1893
- Phrosyne Murray, 1870
- Phyllocnema Thomson, 1861
- Phyllocnemida Péringuey, 1899
- Phyllomaeus Schmidt, 1922
- Plinthocoelium Schmidt, 1924
- Podanychroma Vives, Bentanachs & Chew, 2007
- Polyzonus Dejean, 1835
- Promeces Audinet-Serville, 1834
- Promecidus Fåhraeus, 1872
- Psephania Morati & Huet, 2004
- Pseudictator Juhel, 2015
- Pseudochelidonium Vives, Bentanachs & Chew, 2007
- Pseudoeuchitonia Bentanachs, Morati & Vives, 2010
- Psilacestes Schmidt, 1922
- Psilomastix Schmidt, 1922
- Rhadinomaeus Schmidt, 1922
- Rhopalizarius Schmidt, 1922
- Rhopalizida Jordan, 1894
- Rhopalizodes Schmidt, 1922
- Rhopalizus Thomson, 1864
- Rhopalomeces Schmidt, 1922
- Rugosochroma Vives & Lin, 2013
- Scalenus Gistel, 1848
- Schmidtiana Podaný, 1971
- Schwarzerium Matsushita, 1933
- Sinochroma Bentanachs & Drouin, 2013
- Sphingacestes Schmidt, 1922
- Stenochroma Vives, Bentanachs & Chew, 2009
- Synaptola Bates, 1879
- Tarsotropidus Schmidt, 1922
- Thompsoniana Podaný, 1971
- Tomentaromia Plavilstshikov, 1934
- Trichomaeus Aurivillius, 1927
- Turkaromia Danilevsky, 1993
- Utopileus Schmidt, 1922
- Vittatocrites Adlbauer, 2002
- Xanthospila Fairmaire, 1884
- Xystochroma Schmidt, 1924
- Zambizus Juhel, 2016
- Zonochroma Vives, 2017
- Zonopteroides Podaný, 1968
- Zonopterus Hope, 1842
