= Rhinotragini =

Scientific classification
- Kingdom: Animalia
- Phylum: Arthropoda
- Clade: Pancrustacea
- Class: Insecta
- Order: Coleoptera
- Suborder: Polyphaga
- Infraorder: Cucujiformia
- Family: Cerambycidae
- Subfamily: Cerambycinae
- Tribe: Rhinotragini; Thomson, 1860

Tribe of beetles

Rhinotragini is a tribe of beetles in the subfamily Cerambycinae.

== Genera ==
Rhinotragini contains the following genera:

- Acatinga Santos-Silva, Martins & Clarke, 2010
- Acorethra Bates, 1873
- Acutiphoderes Clarke, 2015
- Acyderophes Clarke, 2015
- Acyphoderes Audinet-Serville, 1833
- Adepimelitta Clarke, 2016
- Aechmutes Bates, 1867
- Agaone Neave, 1939
- Amborotragus Clarke, 2013
- Ameriphoderes Clarke, 2015
- Amerispheca Clarke, 2015
- Anomaloderes Clarke, 2015
- Anomalotragus Clarke, 2010
- Antennommata Clarke, 2010
- Apostropha Bates, 1870
- Brachyphoderes Clarke, 2015
- Bromiades Thomson, 1864
- Caprichasia Clarke, 2013
- Carenoptomerus Tavakilian & Penaherrera-Leiva, 2003
- Catorthontus Waterhouse, 1880
- Chariergodes Zajciw, 1963
- Charisia Champion, 1892
- Chrysaethe Bates, 1873
- Chrysommata Penaherrera-Leiva & Tavakilian, 2003
- Clepitoides Clarke, 2009
- Corallancyla Tippmann, 1960
- Crossomeles Chemsak & Noguera, 1993
- Cylindrommata Tippmann, 1960
- Eclipta Bates, 1873
- Ecliptoides Tavakilian & Peñaherrera-Leiva, 2005
- Ecliptophanes Melzer, 1934
- Ephippiotragus Clarke, 2013
- Epimelitta Bates, 1870
- Epipoda Clarke, 2014
- Erratamelitta Clarke, 2016
- Erythroplatys White, 1855
- Etimasu Santos-Silva, Martins & Clarke, 2010
- Exepimelitta Clarke, 2016
- Fissipoda Clarke, 2014
- Forficuladeres Clarke, 2015
- Giesberteclipta Santos-Silva, Bezark & Martins, 2012
- Giesberticus Wappes & Santos-Silva, 2019
- Grupiara Martins & Santos-Silva, 2010
- Ischasia Thomson, 1864
- Ischasioides Tavakilian & Penaherrera-Leiva, 2003
- Isthmiade Thomson, 1864
- Iyanola Lingafelter & Ivie, 2013
- Katerinaella Vlasak & Santos-Silva, 2018
- Klugiatragus Clarke, Spooner & Willers, 2015
- Laedorcari Santos-Silva, Clarke & Martins, 2011
- Lygrocharis Melzer, 1927
- Mimommata Penaherrera-Leiva & Tavakilian, 2003
- Monneus Magno, 2001
- Neophygopoda Melzer, 1933
- Neoregostoma Monné & Giesbert, 1992
- Neothomasella Santos-Silva, Bezark & Martins, 2018
- Odontocera Audinet-Serville 1833
- Odontocroton Clarke, 2018
- Odontogracilis Clarke, 2015
- Odontomelitta Clarke, 2016
- Ommata White, 1855
- Optomerus Giesbert, 1996
- Oregostoma Audinet-Serville, 1833
- Ornistomus Thomson, 1864
- Oxylymma Pascoe, 1859
- Oxyommata Zajciw, 1870
- Pandrosos Bates, 1867
- Paraeclipta Clarke, 2011
- Paramelitta Clarke, 2014
- Paraphygopoda Clarke, 2014
- Parischasia Tavakilian & Peñaherrera-Leiva, 2005
- Pasiphyle Thomson, 1864
- Phespia Bates, 1873
- Phygomelitta Clarke, 2014
- Phygopoda Thomson, 1864
- Phygopoides Penaherrera-Leiva & Tavakilian, 2003
- Pseudacorethra Tavakilian & Penaherrera-Leiva, 2007
- Pseudagaone Tippmann, 1960
- Pseudisthmiade Tavakilian & Peñaherrera-Leiva, 2005
- Pseudophygopoda Tavakilian & Peñaherrera-Leiva, 2007
- Pyrpotyra Santos-Silva, Martins & Clarke, 2010
- Rashelapso Clarke, Martins & Santos-Silva, 2012
- Rhinobatesia Clarke, 2018
- Rhinotragus Germar, 1824
- Rhopalessa Bates, 1873
- Saltanecydalopsis Barriga & Cepeda, 2007
- Sphecomorpha Newman, 1838
- Stenochariergus Giesbert & Hovore, 1989
- Stenopseustes Bates, 1873
- Stultutragus Clarke, 2010
- Sulcommata Penaherrera-Leiva & Tavakilian, 2003
- Thouvenotiana Penaherrera-Leiva & Tavakilian, 2003
- Tomopterchasia Clarke, 2013
- Tomopteropsis Penaherrera-Leiva & Tavakilian, 2003
- Tomopterus Audinet-Serville, 1833
- Xenocrasis Bates, 1873
- Xenocrasoides Tavakilian & Penaherrera-Leiva, 2003

== Selected former genera ==
- Panamapoda Clarke, 2014
