= Anomalotragus recurvielytra =

Scientific classification
- Domain: Eukaryota
- Kingdom: Animalia
- Phylum: Arthropoda
- Class: Insecta
- Order: Coleoptera
- Suborder: Polyphaga
- Infraorder: Cucujiformia
- Family: Cerambycidae
- Subfamily: Cerambycinae
- Tribe: Rhinotragini
- Genus: Anomalotragus
- Species: A. recurvielytra

Binomial name
- Anomalotragus recurvielytra Clarke, 2010

Species of beetle

Anomalotragus recurvielytra is a species of beetle in the family Cerambycidae. It was described by Clarke in 2010.
