= Aechmutes =

Scientific classification
- Kingdom: Animalia
- Phylum: Arthropoda
- Class: Insecta
- Order: Coleoptera
- Suborder: Polyphaga
- Infraorder: Cucujiformia
- Family: Cerambycidae
- Tribe: Rhinotragini
- Genus: Aechmutes

Genus of beetles

Aechmutes is a genus of beetles in the family Cerambycidae, containing the following species:

- Aechmutes armatus Gounelle, 1911
- Aechmutes boliviensis Clarke, 2012
- Aechmutes lycoides Bates, 1867
- Aechmutes subandinus Clarke, 2012
