= Crossomeles aureopilis =

Scientific classification
- Domain: Eukaryota
- Kingdom: Animalia
- Phylum: Arthropoda
- Class: Insecta
- Order: Coleoptera
- Suborder: Polyphaga
- Infraorder: Cucujiformia
- Family: Cerambycidae
- Genus: Crossomeles
- Species: C. aureopilis

Binomial name
- Crossomeles aureopilis (Fisher, 1953)

Species of beetle

Crossomeles aureopilis is a species of beetle in the family Cerambycidae. It was described by Fisher in 1953.
