= Chariergodes anceps =

Scientific classification
- Kingdom: Animalia
- Phylum: Arthropoda
- Class: Insecta
- Order: Coleoptera
- Suborder: Polyphaga
- Infraorder: Cucujiformia
- Family: Cerambycidae
- Genus: Chariergodes
- Species: C. anceps

Binomial name
- Chariergodes anceps (Melzer, 1927)

Species of beetle

Chariergodes anceps is a species of beetle in the family Cerambycidae. It was described by Melzer in 1927.
