= Chrysommata keithi =

Scientific classification
- Domain: Eukaryota
- Kingdom: Animalia
- Phylum: Arthropoda
- Class: Insecta
- Order: Coleoptera
- Suborder: Polyphaga
- Infraorder: Cucujiformia
- Family: Cerambycidae
- Genus: Chrysommata
- Species: C. keithi

Binomial name
- Chrysommata keithi (Tavakilian & Penaherrera-Leiva, 2003)

Synonyms
- Ommata keithi Tavakilian & Peñaherrera, 2003 (Tavakilian & Peñaherrera, 2007)

Species of beetle

Chrysommata keithi is a species of beetle in the family Cerambycidae. It was described by Tavakilian and Penaherrera-Leiva in 2003.
