= Anomalotragus =

Scientific classification
- Domain: Eukaryota
- Kingdom: Animalia
- Phylum: Arthropoda
- Class: Insecta
- Order: Coleoptera
- Suborder: Polyphaga
- Infraorder: Cucujiformia
- Family: Cerambycidae
- Tribe: Rhinotragini
- Genus: Anomalotragus; Clarke, 2010

Species
- Anomalotragus morrisi Clarke, 2010; Anomalotragus recurvielytra Clarke, 2010

Genus of beetles

Anomalotragus is a genus of beetles in the family Cerambycidae, containing the following species:
