= Stultutragus crotonaphilus =

Scientific classification
- Kingdom: Animalia
- Phylum: Arthropoda
- Class: Insecta
- Order: Coleoptera
- Suborder: Polyphaga
- Infraorder: Cucujiformia
- Family: Cerambycidae
- Genus: Stultutragus
- Species: S. crotonaphilus

Binomial name
- Stultutragus crotonaphilus Clarke, 2010

Species of beetle

Stultutragus crotonaphilus is a species of beetle in the family Cerambycidae. It was described by Clarke in 2010.
