= Oxylymma telephorina =

Scientific classification
- Kingdom: Animalia
- Phylum: Arthropoda
- Clade: Pancrustacea
- Class: Insecta
- Order: Coleoptera
- Suborder: Polyphaga
- Infraorder: Cucujiformia
- Family: Cerambycidae
- Genus: Oxylymma
- Species: O. telephorina

Binomial name
- Oxylymma telephorina Bates, 1870

Species of beetle

Oxylymma telephorina is a species of beetle in the family Cerambycidae. It was described by Henry Walter Bates in 1870. It occurs in Ecuador and western Brazil (Amazonas, Rondônia).
