= Parischasia ligulatipennis =

Scientific classification
- Kingdom: Animalia
- Phylum: Arthropoda
- Class: Insecta
- Order: Coleoptera
- Suborder: Polyphaga
- Infraorder: Cucujiformia
- Family: Cerambycidae
- Genus: Parischasia
- Species: P. ligulatipennis

Binomial name
- Parischasia ligulatipennis (Gounelle, 1911)

Species of beetle

Parischasia ligulatipennis is a species of beetle in the family Cerambycidae. It was described by Gounelle in 1911.
