= Clepitoides anae =

Scientific classification
- Domain: Eukaryota
- Kingdom: Animalia
- Phylum: Arthropoda
- Class: Insecta
- Order: Coleoptera
- Suborder: Polyphaga
- Infraorder: Cucujiformia
- Family: Cerambycidae
- Genus: Clepitoides
- Species: C. anae

Binomial name
- Clepitoides anae Clarke, 2009

Species of beetle

Clepitoides anae is a species of beetle in the family Cerambycidae. It was described by Clarke in 2009.
