= Acorethra =

Scientific classification
- Domain: Eukaryota
- Kingdom: Animalia
- Phylum: Arthropoda
- Class: Insecta
- Order: Coleoptera
- Suborder: Polyphaga
- Infraorder: Cucujiformia
- Family: Cerambycidae
- Tribe: Rhinotragini
- Genus: Acorethra

Genus of beetles

Acorethra is a genus of beetles in the family Cerambycidae, containing the following species:

- Acorethra aureofasciata Gounelle, 1911
- Acorethra erato (Newman, 1840)
