= Paramelitta =

Scientific classification
- Kingdom: Animalia
- Phylum: Arthropoda
- Clade: Pancrustacea
- Class: Insecta
- Order: Coleoptera
- Suborder: Polyphaga
- Infraorder: Cucujiformia
- Family: Cerambycidae
- Subfamily: Cerambycinae
- Tribe: Rhinotragini
- Genus: Paramelitta; Clarke, 2014

Genus of beetles

Paramelitta is a genus of beetles belonging to the family Cerambycidae.

== Species ==
- Paramelitta aglaia (Newman, 1840)
- Paramelitta wappesi Clarke, 2014
