= Chariergodes =

Scientific classification
- Kingdom: Animalia
- Phylum: Arthropoda
- Class: Insecta
- Order: Coleoptera
- Suborder: Polyphaga
- Infraorder: Cucujiformia
- Family: Cerambycidae
- Subfamily: Cerambycinae
- Tribe: Rhinotragini
- Genus: Chariergodes; Zajciw, 1963

Genus of beetles

Chariergodes is a genus of beetles in the family Cerambycidae, containing the following species:

- Chariergodes anceps (Melzer, 1927)
- Chariergodes carinicollis (Zajciw, 1963)
- Chariergodes flava (Zajciw, 1963)
- Chariergodes turrialbae (Giesbert, 1991)
