= Paraeclipta tenuis =

Scientific classification
- Kingdom: Animalia
- Phylum: Arthropoda
- Class: Insecta
- Order: Coleoptera
- Suborder: Polyphaga
- Infraorder: Cucujiformia
- Family: Cerambycidae
- Genus: Paraeclipta
- Species: P. tenuis

Binomial name
- Paraeclipta tenuis (Burmeister, 1865)

Species of beetle

Paraeclipta tenuis is a species of beetle in the family Cerambycidae. It was described by Hermann Burmeister in 1865.
