= Rhopalessa demissa =

Scientific classification
- Kingdom: Animalia
- Phylum: Arthropoda
- Class: Insecta
- Order: Coleoptera
- Suborder: Polyphaga
- Infraorder: Cucujiformia
- Family: Cerambycidae
- Genus: Rhopalessa
- Species: R. demissa

Binomial name
- Rhopalessa demissa (Melzer, 1934)

Species of beetle

Rhopalessa demissa is a species of beetle in the family Cerambycidae. It was described by Melzer in 1934.
