= Acorethra aureofasciata =

Scientific classification
- Kingdom: Animalia
- Phylum: Arthropoda
- Clade: Pancrustacea
- Class: Insecta
- Order: Coleoptera
- Suborder: Polyphaga
- Infraorder: Cucujiformia
- Family: Cerambycidae
- Genus: Acorethra
- Species: A. aureofasciata

Binomial name
- Acorethra aureofasciata Gounelle, 1911

Species of beetle

Acorethra aureofasciata is a species of beetle in the family Cerambycidae. It was described by Gounelle in 1911. It is found in Brazil (Goiás, Espírito Santo, Rio de Janeiro, São Paulo).
