= Rhopalessa subandina =

Scientific classification
- Kingdom: Animalia
- Phylum: Arthropoda
- Class: Insecta
- Order: Coleoptera
- Suborder: Polyphaga
- Infraorder: Cucujiformia
- Family: Cerambycidae
- Genus: Rhopalessa
- Species: R. subandina

Binomial name
- Rhopalessa subandina Clarke, Martins & Santos-Silva, 2011

Species of beetle

Rhopalessa subandina is a species of beetle in the family Cerambycidae. It was described by Clarke, Martins and Santos-Silva in 2011.
