= Tomopteropsis =

Scientific classification
- Domain: Eukaryota
- Kingdom: Animalia
- Phylum: Arthropoda
- Class: Insecta
- Order: Coleoptera
- Suborder: Polyphaga
- Infraorder: Cucujiformia
- Family: Cerambycidae
- Subfamily: Cerambycinae
- Tribe: Rhinotragini
- Genus: Tomopteropsis; Peñaherrera & Tavakilian, 2003
- Species: T. cerdai

Binomial name
- Tomopteropsis cerdai Peñaherrera & Tavakilian, 2003

Species of beetles

Tomopteropsis is a genus of longhorned beetles in the family Cerambycidae. This genus has a single species, Tomopteropsis cerdai, found in French Guiana and Brazil.
