= Phespia cercerina =

Scientific classification
- Domain: Eukaryota
- Kingdom: Animalia
- Phylum: Arthropoda
- Class: Insecta
- Order: Coleoptera
- Suborder: Polyphaga
- Infraorder: Cucujiformia
- Family: Cerambycidae
- Genus: Phespia
- Species: P. cercerina

Binomial name
- Phespia cercerina (Bates, 1870)

Synonyms
- Odontocera cercerina Bates, 1870

Species of beetle

Phespia cercerina is a species of beetle in the family Cerambycidae. It was described by Henry Walter Bates in 1870. It occurs in French Guiana, Brazil, Paraguay, and Peru.
