= Oregostoma bipartitum =

Scientific classification
- Kingdom: Animalia
- Phylum: Arthropoda
- Clade: Pancrustacea
- Class: Insecta
- Order: Coleoptera
- Suborder: Polyphaga
- Infraorder: Cucujiformia
- Family: Cerambycidae
- Genus: Oregostoma
- Species: O. bipartitum

Binomial name
- Oregostoma bipartitum (Bates, 1873)

Species of beetle

Oregostoma bipartitum is a species of beetle in the family Cerambycidae. It was described by Henry Walter Bates in 1873. It is found in Brazil (Espírito Santo, Rio de Janeiro, São Paulo, Paraná, Santa Catarina, Rio Grande do Sul), Paraguay and Argentina (Misiones).
