= Phespia =

Scientific classification
- Domain: Eukaryota
- Kingdom: Animalia
- Phylum: Arthropoda
- Class: Insecta
- Order: Coleoptera
- Suborder: Polyphaga
- Infraorder: Cucujiformia
- Family: Cerambycidae
- Tribe: Rhinotragini
- Genus: Phespia; Bates, 1873

Genus of beetles

Phespia is a genus of beetles in the family Cerambycidae. It occurs in South and Central America.

== Species ==
There are four species:

- Phespia cercerina (Bates, 1870)
- Phespia corinna (Pascoe, 1866)
- Phespia gibbosa Magno, 1992
- Phespia simulans Bates, 1873
