= Sulcommata =

Scientific classification
- Kingdom: Animalia
- Phylum: Arthropoda
- Class: Insecta
- Order: Coleoptera
- Suborder: Polyphaga
- Infraorder: Cucujiformia
- Family: Cerambycidae
- Tribe: Rhinotragini
- Genus: Sulcommata

Genus of beetles

Sulcommata is a genus of beetles in the family Cerambycidae, containing the following species:

- Sulcommata durantoni Penaherrera-Leiva & Tavakilian, 2003
- Sulcommata ruficollis Tavakilian & Penaherrera-Leiva, 2003
