= Acatinga =

Scientific classification
- Domain: Eukaryota
- Kingdom: Animalia
- Phylum: Arthropoda
- Class: Insecta
- Order: Coleoptera
- Suborder: Polyphaga
- Infraorder: Cucujiformia
- Family: Cerambycidae
- Tribe: Rhinotragini
- Genus: Acatinga

Genus of beetles

Acatinga is a genus of beetles in the family Cerambycidae, containing the following species:

- Acatinga boucheri (Tavakilian & Peñaherrera-Leiva, 2005)
- Acatinga gallardi (Penaherrera-Leiva & Tavakilian, 2004)
- Acatinga maia (Newman, 1841)
- Acatinga quinquemaculata (Zajciw, 1966)
