= Mimommata mollardi =

Scientific classification
- Kingdom: Animalia
- Phylum: Arthropoda
- Class: Insecta
- Order: Coleoptera
- Suborder: Polyphaga
- Infraorder: Cucujiformia
- Family: Cerambycidae
- Genus: Mimommata
- Species: M. mollardi

Binomial name
- Mimommata mollardi Penaherrera-Leiva & Tavakilian, 2003

Species of beetle

Mimommata mollardi is a species of beetle in the family Cerambycidae.
