= Stenochariergus hollyae =

Scientific classification
- Kingdom: Animalia
- Phylum: Arthropoda
- Class: Insecta
- Order: Coleoptera
- Suborder: Polyphaga
- Infraorder: Cucujiformia
- Family: Cerambycidae
- Genus: Stenochariergus
- Species: S. hollyae

Binomial name
- Stenochariergus hollyae Giesbert & Hovore, 1989

Species of beetle

Stenochariergus hollyae is a species of beetle in the family Cerambycidae. It was described by Giesbert and Hovore in 1989.
