= Pyrpotyra paradisiaca =

Scientific classification
- Domain: Eukaryota
- Kingdom: Animalia
- Phylum: Arthropoda
- Class: Insecta
- Order: Coleoptera
- Suborder: Polyphaga
- Infraorder: Cucujiformia
- Family: Cerambycidae
- Genus: Pyrpotyra
- Species: P. paradisiaca

Binomial name
- Pyrpotyra paradisiaca (Tippmann, 1953)

Species of beetle

Pyrpotyra paradisiaca is a species of beetle in the family Cerambycidae. It was described by Tippmann in 1953.
