= Mimommata =

Scientific classification
- Kingdom: Animalia
- Phylum: Arthropoda
- Class: Insecta
- Order: Coleoptera
- Suborder: Polyphaga
- Infraorder: Cucujiformia
- Family: Cerambycidae
- Tribe: Rhinotragini
- Genus: Mimommata

Genus of beetles

Mimommata is a genus of beetles in the family Cerambycidae, containing the following species:

- Mimommata mollardi Penaherrera-Leiva & Tavakilian, 2003
- Mimommata pernauti Tavakilian & Penaherrera-Leiva, 2003
