= Rhinobatesia =

Scientific classification
- Kingdom: Animalia
- Phylum: Arthropoda
- Clade: Pancrustacea
- Class: Insecta
- Order: Coleoptera
- Suborder: Polyphaga
- Infraorder: Cucujiformia
- Family: Cerambycidae
- Subfamily: Cerambycinae
- Tribe: Rhinotragini
- Genus: Rhinobatesia; Clarke, 2018
- Species: R. rugicollis

Binomial name
- Rhinobatesia rugicollis (Bates, 1880)

Synonyms
- Odontocera rugicollis Bates, 1880; Odontocera nevermanni Fisher, 1930

Genus of beetles

Rhinobatesia is a genus of beetle of the family Cerambycidae. It is monotypic, being represented by the single species, Rhinobatesia rugicollis,, which is found in Mexico (Veracruz) and Costa Rica.

== Description ==
Adults reach a length of about 15.75 mm (0.620 in) for males and 16.95 mm (0.667 in) for females.
