= Xenocrasis panamensis =

Scientific classification
- Kingdom: Animalia
- Phylum: Arthropoda
- Class: Insecta
- Order: Coleoptera
- Suborder: Polyphaga
- Infraorder: Cucujiformia
- Family: Cerambycidae
- Genus: Xenocrasis
- Species: X. panamensis

Binomial name
- Xenocrasis panamensis Giesbert, 1991

Species of beetle

Xenocrasis panamensis is a species of beetle in the family Cerambycidae. It was described by Giesbert in 1991.
