= Stultutragus endoluteus =

Scientific classification
- Kingdom: Animalia
- Phylum: Arthropoda
- Class: Insecta
- Order: Coleoptera
- Suborder: Polyphaga
- Infraorder: Cucujiformia
- Family: Cerambycidae
- Genus: Stultutragus
- Species: S. endoluteus

Binomial name
- Stultutragus endoluteus Bezark, Santos-Silva & Martins, 2011

Species of beetle

Stultutragus endoluteus is a species of beetle in the family Cerambycidae. It was described by Bezark, Santos-Silva and Martins in 2011.
