= Corallancyla neotropica =

Scientific classification
- Domain: Eukaryota
- Kingdom: Animalia
- Phylum: Arthropoda
- Class: Insecta
- Order: Coleoptera
- Suborder: Polyphaga
- Infraorder: Cucujiformia
- Family: Cerambycidae
- Genus: Corallancyla
- Species: C. neotropica

Binomial name
- Corallancyla neotropica Tippmann, 1960

Species of beetle

Corallancyla neotropica is a species of beetle in the family Cerambycidae. It was described by Tippmann in 1960.
