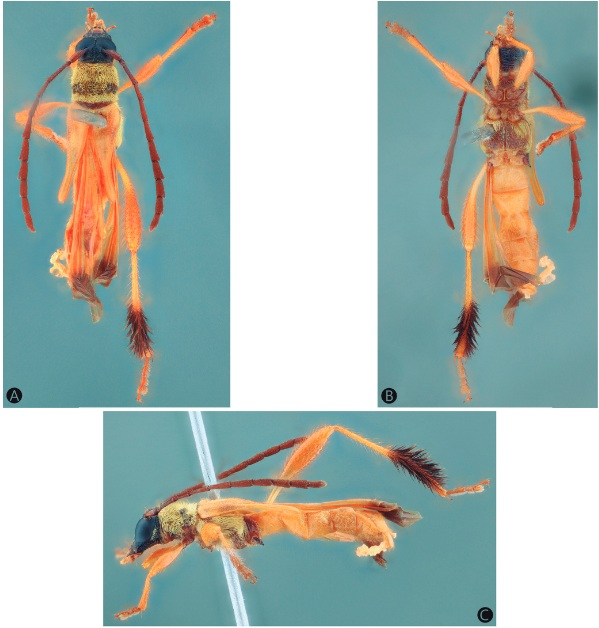

Scientific classification
- Kingdom: Animalia
- Phylum: Arthropoda
- Clade: Pancrustacea
- Class: Insecta
- Order: Coleoptera
- Suborder: Polyphaga
- Infraorder: Cucujiformia
- Family: Cerambycidae
- Genus: Pseudophygopoda
- Species: P. subvestita

Binomial name
- Pseudophygopoda subvestita (White, 1855)

Synonyms
- Odontocera subvestita White, 1855

= Pseudophygopoda subvestita =

Species of beetle

Pseudophygopoda subvestita is a species of beetle of the family Cerambycidae. It is found in Brazil and French Guiana.
