= Erythroplatys cardinalis =

Scientific classification
- Domain: Eukaryota
- Kingdom: Animalia
- Phylum: Arthropoda
- Class: Insecta
- Order: Coleoptera
- Suborder: Polyphaga
- Infraorder: Cucujiformia
- Family: Cerambycidae
- Genus: Erythroplatys
- Species: E. cardinalis

Binomial name
- Erythroplatys cardinalis Monné & Fragoso, 1990

Species of beetle

Erythroplatys cardinalis is a species of beetle in the family Cerambycidae. It was described by Monné and Fragoso in 1990.
