= Rhopalessa clavicornis =

Scientific classification
- Kingdom: Animalia
- Phylum: Arthropoda
- Class: Insecta
- Order: Coleoptera
- Suborder: Polyphaga
- Infraorder: Cucujiformia
- Family: Cerambycidae
- Genus: Rhopalessa
- Species: R. clavicornis

Binomial name
- Rhopalessa clavicornis (Bates, 1873)

Species of beetle

Rhopalessa clavicornis is a species of beetle in the family Cerambycidae. It was described by Henry Walter Bates in 1873.
