= Ischasioides gounellei =

Scientific classification
- Kingdom: Animalia
- Phylum: Arthropoda
- Class: Insecta
- Order: Coleoptera
- Suborder: Polyphaga
- Infraorder: Cucujiformia
- Family: Cerambycidae
- Genus: Ischasioides
- Species: I. gounellei

Binomial name
- Ischasioides gounellei Tavakilian & Penaherrera-Leiva, 2003

Species of beetle

Ischasioides gounellei is a species of beetle in the family Cerambycidae. It was described by Tavakilian and Penaherrera-Leiva in 2003.
