= Erythroplatys boliviensis =

Scientific classification
- Domain: Eukaryota
- Kingdom: Animalia
- Phylum: Arthropoda
- Class: Insecta
- Order: Coleoptera
- Suborder: Polyphaga
- Infraorder: Cucujiformia
- Family: Cerambycidae
- Genus: Erythroplatys
- Species: E. boliviensis

Binomial name
- Erythroplatys boliviensis Clarke, 2012

Species of beetle

Erythroplatys boliviensis is a species of beetle in the family Cerambycidae. It was described by Clarke in 2012.
