= Neophygopoda =

Scientific classification
- Kingdom: Animalia
- Phylum: Arthropoda
- Class: Insecta
- Order: Coleoptera
- Suborder: Polyphaga
- Infraorder: Cucujiformia
- Family: Cerambycidae
- Subfamily: Cerambycinae
- Tribe: Rhinotragini
- Genus: Neophygopoda; Melzer, 1933

Genus of beetles

Neophygopoda is a genus of beetles in the family Cerambycidae.

== Species ==
Neophygopoda contains the following species:

- Neophygopoda nigritarsis (Gounelle, 1911)
- Neophygopoda tibialis Melzer, 1933
