= Ecliptophanes silvai =

Scientific classification
- Kingdom: Animalia
- Phylum: Arthropoda
- Class: Insecta
- Order: Coleoptera
- Suborder: Polyphaga
- Infraorder: Cucujiformia
- Family: Cerambycidae
- Genus: Ecliptophanes
- Species: E. silvai

Binomial name
- Ecliptophanes silvai (Zajciw, 1958)

Species of beetle

Ecliptophanes silvai is a species of beetle in the family Cerambycidae. It was described by Zajciw in 1958.
