= Phespia simulans =

Scientific classification
- Kingdom: Animalia
- Phylum: Arthropoda
- Class: Insecta
- Order: Coleoptera
- Suborder: Polyphaga
- Infraorder: Cucujiformia
- Family: Cerambycidae
- Genus: Phespia
- Species: P. simulans

Binomial name
- Phespia simulans Bates, 1873

Species of beetle

Phespia simulans is a species of beetle in the family Cerambycidae. It was described by Henry Walter Bates in 1873. It occurs in Brazil and Argentina.
