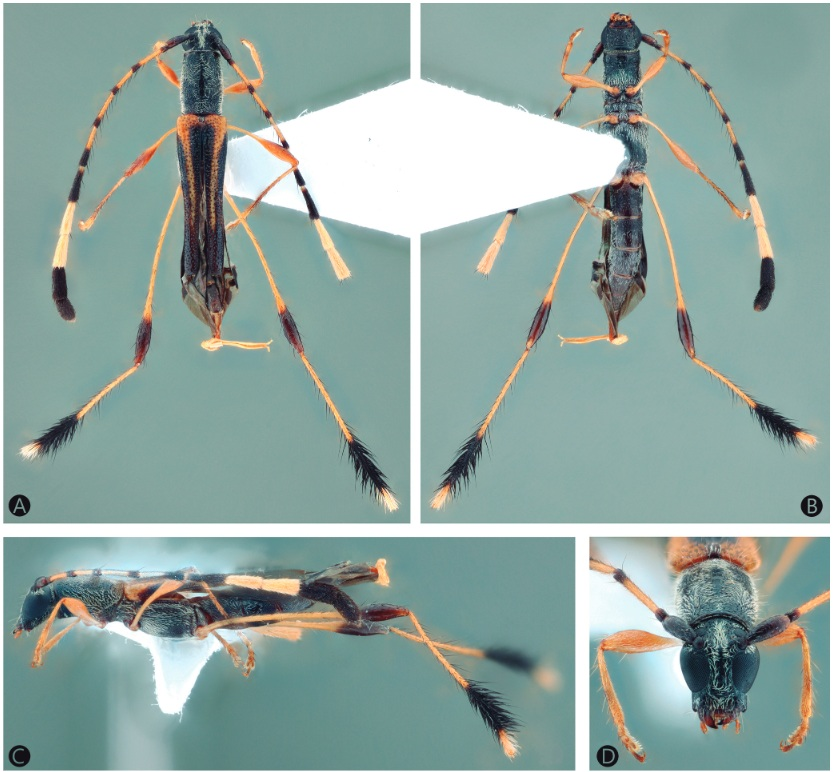

Scientific classification
- Kingdom: Animalia
- Phylum: Arthropoda
- Clade: Pancrustacea
- Class: Insecta
- Order: Coleoptera
- Suborder: Polyphaga
- Infraorder: Cucujiformia
- Family: Cerambycidae
- Genus: Ecliptophanes
- Species: E. chacunfrancozi

Binomial name
- Ecliptophanes chacunfrancozi (Tavakilian & Penaherrera-Leiva, 2003)

Synonyms
- Ommata chacunfrancozi Tavakilian & Peñaherrera, 2003 (Tavakilian & Peñaherrera, 2007)

= Ecliptophanes chacunfrancozi =

Species of beetle

Ecliptophanes chacunfrancozi is a species of beetle in the family Cerambycidae. It was described by Tavakilian and Penaherrera-Leiva in 2003. It is found in French Guiana and Brazil (Amazonas).
