= Laedorcari vestitipennis =

Scientific classification
- Kingdom: Animalia
- Phylum: Arthropoda
- Class: Insecta
- Order: Coleoptera
- Suborder: Polyphaga
- Infraorder: Cucujiformia
- Family: Cerambycidae
- Genus: Laedorcari
- Species: L. vestitipennis

Binomial name
- Laedorcari vestitipennis (Zajciw, 1963)

Species of beetle

Laedorcari vestitipennis is a species of beetle in the family Cerambycidae.
