= Pandrosos proximus =

Scientific classification
- Kingdom: Animalia
- Phylum: Arthropoda
- Class: Insecta
- Order: Coleoptera
- Suborder: Polyphaga
- Infraorder: Cucujiformia
- Family: Cerambycidae
- Genus: Pandrosos
- Species: P. proximus

Binomial name
- Pandrosos proximus Mermudes & Napp, 2009

Species of beetle

Pandrosos proximus is a species of beetle in the family Cerambycidae. It was described by Mermudes and Napp in 2009.
