= Xenocrasis =

Scientific classification
- Kingdom: Animalia
- Phylum: Arthropoda
- Class: Insecta
- Order: Coleoptera
- Suborder: Polyphaga
- Infraorder: Cucujiformia
- Family: Cerambycidae
- Tribe: Rhinotragini
- Genus: Xenocrasis

Genus of beetles

Xenocrasis is a genus of beetles in the family Cerambycidae, containing the following species:

- Xenocrasis anamarcelae Tavakilian & Penaherrera-Leiva, 2003
- Xenocrasis badeni Bates, 1873
- Xenocrasis fereyi Tavakilian & Penaherrera-Leiva, 2003
- Xenocrasis panamensis Giesbert, 1991
- Xenocrasis politipennis (Zajciw, 1971)
