= Clepitoides =

Scientific classification
- Domain: Eukaryota
- Kingdom: Animalia
- Phylum: Arthropoda
- Class: Insecta
- Order: Coleoptera
- Suborder: Polyphaga
- Infraorder: Cucujiformia
- Family: Cerambycidae
- Subfamily: Cerambycinae
- Tribe: Rhinotragini
- Genus: Clepitoides; Clarke, 2009

Genus of beetles

Clepitoides is a genus of beetles in the family Cerambycidae, first described by Robin O. S. Clarke in 2009.

== Species ==
Clepitoides contains the following species:

- Clepitoides anae Clarke, 2009
- Clepitoides crocata (Bates, 1873)
- Clepitoides gerardi Clarke, 2009
- Clepitoides neei Clarke, 2009
- Clepitoides pallidicornis (Zajciw, 1966)
- Clepitoides picturata (Gounelle, 1911)
- Clepitoides thomasi Santos-Silva, Martins & Clarke, 2013
- Clepitoides virgata (Gounelle, 1911)
