= Acatinga boucheri =

Scientific classification
- Domain: Eukaryota
- Kingdom: Animalia
- Phylum: Arthropoda
- Class: Insecta
- Order: Coleoptera
- Suborder: Polyphaga
- Infraorder: Cucujiformia
- Family: Cerambycidae
- Genus: Acatinga
- Species: A. boucheri

Binomial name
- Acatinga boucheri (Tavakilian & Peñaherrera-Leiva, 2005)

Species of beetle

Acatinga boucheri is a species of beetle in the family Cerambycidae. It was described by Tavakilian and Peñaherrera-Leiva in 2005.
