= Sphecomorpha =

Scientific classification
- Kingdom: Animalia
- Phylum: Arthropoda
- Class: Insecta
- Order: Coleoptera
- Suborder: Polyphaga
- Infraorder: Cucujiformia
- Family: Cerambycidae
- Subfamily: Cerambycinae
- Tribe: Rhinotragini
- Genus: Sphecomorpha; Newman, 1838

Genus of beetles

Sphecomorpha is a genus of beetles in the family Cerambycidae, containing the following species:

- Sphecomorpha chalybea Newman, 1838
- Sphecomorpha faurei Tavakilian & Penaherrera-Leiva, 2007
- Sphecomorpha forficulifera (Gounelle, 1913)
- Sphecomorpha murina (Klug, 1825)
- Sphecomorpha rufa Gounelle, 1911
- Sphecomorpha vespiventris (Bates, 1880)
