= Pyrpotyra =

Scientific classification
- Domain: Eukaryota
- Kingdom: Animalia
- Phylum: Arthropoda
- Class: Insecta
- Order: Coleoptera
- Suborder: Polyphaga
- Infraorder: Cucujiformia
- Family: Cerambycidae
- Subfamily: Cerambycinae
- Tribe: Rhinotragini
- Genus: Pyrpotyra; Santos-Silva, Martins & Clarke, 2010

Genus of beetles

Pyrpotyra is a genus of beetles in the family Cerambycidae, containing the following species:

- Pyrpotyra albitarsis (Galileo & Martins, 2010)
- Pyrpotyra capixaba Santos-Silva, Martins & Clarke, 2010
- Pyrpotyra paradisiaca (Tippmann, 1953)
- Pyrpotyra paraensis Santos-Silva, Martins & Clarke, 2010
- Pyrpotyra pytinga Santos-Silva, Martins & Clarke, 2010
