= Acatinga quinquemaculata =

Scientific classification
- Domain: Eukaryota
- Kingdom: Animalia
- Phylum: Arthropoda
- Class: Insecta
- Order: Coleoptera
- Suborder: Polyphaga
- Infraorder: Cucujiformia
- Family: Cerambycidae
- Genus: Acatinga
- Species: A. quinquemaculata

Binomial name
- Acatinga quinquemaculata (Zajciw, 1966)

Species of beetle

Acatinga quinquemaculata is a species of beetle in the family Cerambycidae. It was described by Zajciw in 1966.
