= Stenochariergus =

Scientific classification
- Kingdom: Animalia
- Phylum: Arthropoda
- Class: Insecta
- Order: Coleoptera
- Suborder: Polyphaga
- Infraorder: Cucujiformia
- Family: Cerambycidae
- Tribe: Rhinotragini
- Genus: Stenochariergus

Genus of beetle

Stenochariergus is a genus of beetles in the family Cerambycidae, containing the following species:

- Stenochariergus dorianae Giesbert & Hovore, 1989
- Stenochariergus hollyae Giesbert & Hovore, 1989
