= Chariergodes flava =

Scientific classification
- Kingdom: Animalia
- Phylum: Arthropoda
- Clade: Pancrustacea
- Class: Insecta
- Order: Coleoptera
- Suborder: Polyphaga
- Infraorder: Cucujiformia
- Family: Cerambycidae
- Genus: Chariergodes
- Species: C. flava

Binomial name
- Chariergodes flava (Zajciw, 1963)

Species of beetle

Chariergodes flava is a species of beetle in the family Cerambycidae. It was described by Zajciw in 1963. It is found in Brazil (Bahia, Minas Gerais, Espírito Santo, Rio de Janeiro).
