= Pseudophygopoda =

Scientific classification
- Kingdom: Animalia
- Phylum: Arthropoda
- Clade: Pancrustacea
- Class: Insecta
- Order: Coleoptera
- Suborder: Polyphaga
- Infraorder: Cucujiformia
- Family: Cerambycidae
- Subfamily: Cerambycinae
- Tribe: Rhinotragini
- Genus: Pseudophygopoda; Tavakilian & Peñaherrera, 2007

Synonyms
- Panamapoda Clarke, 2014

Genus of beetles

Pseudophygopoda is a genus of beetles belonging to the family Cerambycidae.

== Species ==
- Pseudophygopoda panamensis (Giesbert, 1996)
- Pseudophygopoda subvestita (White, 1855)
