= Pseudophygopoda panamensis =

Scientific classification
- Kingdom: Animalia
- Phylum: Arthropoda
- Clade: Pancrustacea
- Class: Insecta
- Order: Coleoptera
- Suborder: Polyphaga
- Infraorder: Cucujiformia
- Family: Cerambycidae
- Genus: Pseudophygopoda
- Species: P. panamensis

Binomial name
- Pseudophygopoda panamensis (Giesbert, 1996)

Synonyms
- Phygopoda panamensis Giesbert, 1996; Panamapoda panamensis

Species of beetle

Pseudophygopoda panamensis is a species of beetle in the family Cerambycidae. It was described by Giesbert in 1996. It is found in Panama.
