= Oregostoma nigripes =

Scientific classification
- Kingdom: Animalia
- Phylum: Arthropoda
- Class: Insecta
- Order: Coleoptera
- Suborder: Polyphaga
- Infraorder: Cucujiformia
- Family: Cerambycidae
- Genus: Oregostoma
- Species: O. nigripes

Binomial name
- Oregostoma nigripes Audinet-Serville, 1833

Species of beetle

Oregostoma nigripes is a species of beetle in the family Cerambycidae. It was described by Audinet-Serville in 1833.
