= Oxylymma gibbicollis =

Scientific classification
- Domain: Eukaryota
- Kingdom: Animalia
- Phylum: Arthropoda
- Class: Insecta
- Order: Coleoptera
- Suborder: Polyphaga
- Infraorder: Cucujiformia
- Family: Cerambycidae
- Genus: Oxylymma
- Species: O. gibbicollis

Binomial name
- Oxylymma gibbicollis Bates, 1873

Species of beetle

Oxylymma gibbicollis is a species of beetle in the family Cerambycidae. It was described by Henry Walter Bates in 1873. It occurs in Bahia, Brazil.
