= Paraeclipta flavipes =

Scientific classification
- Kingdom: Animalia
- Phylum: Arthropoda
- Class: Insecta
- Order: Coleoptera
- Suborder: Polyphaga
- Infraorder: Cucujiformia
- Family: Cerambycidae
- Genus: Paraeclipta
- Species: P. flavipes

Binomial name
- Paraeclipta flavipes (Melzer, 1922)

Species of beetle

Paraeclipta flavipes is a species of beetle in the family Cerambycidae. It was described by Melzer in 1922.
