= Cylindrommata =

Scientific classification
- Kingdom: Animalia
- Phylum: Arthropoda
- Class: Insecta
- Order: Coleoptera
- Suborder: Polyphaga
- Infraorder: Cucujiformia
- Family: Cerambycidae
- Subfamily: Cerambycinae
- Tribe: Rhinotragini
- Genus: Cylindrommata; Tippmann, 1960

Genus of beetles

Cylindrommata is a genus of beetles in the family Cerambycidae, containing the following species:

- Cylindrommata aurantia Monne & Mermudes, 2009
- Cylindrommata longissima Tippmann, 1960
- Cylindrommata lustrata Monne & Mermudes, 2009
- Cylindrommata susanae Monne & Mermudes, 2009
