= Stultutragus linsleyi =

Scientific classification
- Kingdom: Animalia
- Phylum: Arthropoda
- Class: Insecta
- Order: Coleoptera
- Suborder: Polyphaga
- Infraorder: Cucujiformia
- Family: Cerambycidae
- Genus: Stultutragus
- Species: S. linsleyi

Binomial name
- Stultutragus linsleyi (Fisher, 1947)

Species of beetle

Stultutragus linsleyi is a species of beetle in the family Cerambycidae. It was described by Fisher in 1947.
