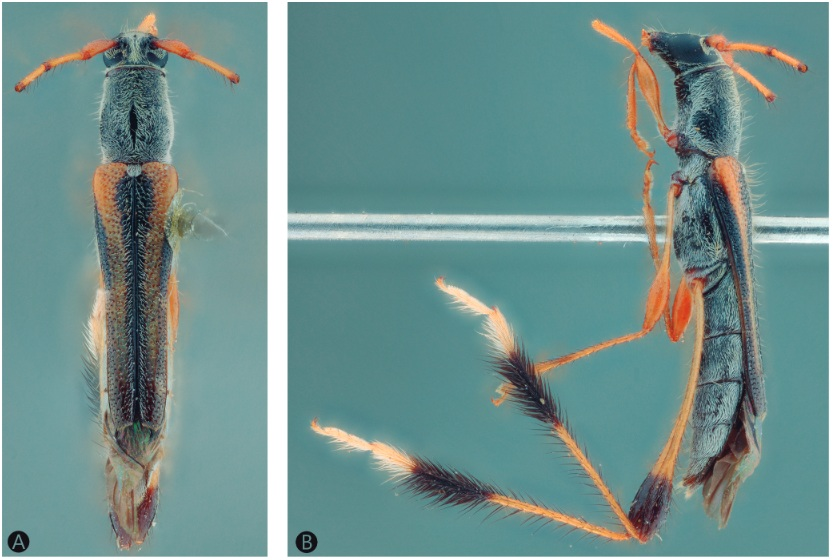

Scientific classification
- Kingdom: Animalia
- Phylum: Arthropoda
- Clade: Pancrustacea
- Class: Insecta
- Order: Coleoptera
- Suborder: Polyphaga
- Infraorder: Cucujiformia
- Family: Cerambycidae
- Genus: Ecliptophanes
- Species: E. scopipes

Binomial name
- Ecliptophanes scopipes (Zajciw, 1965)

= Ecliptophanes scopipes =

Species of beetle

Ecliptophanes scopipes is a species of beetle in the family Cerambycidae. It was described by Zajciw in 1965.
