= Ornistomus simulatrix =

Scientific classification
- Kingdom: Animalia
- Phylum: Arthropoda
- Class: Insecta
- Order: Coleoptera
- Suborder: Polyphaga
- Infraorder: Cucujiformia
- Family: Cerambycidae
- Genus: Ornistomus
- Species: O. simulatrix

Binomial name
- Ornistomus simulatrix Clarke, 2012

Species of beetle

Ornistomus simulatrix is a species of beetle in the family Cerambycidae. It was described by Clarke in 2012.
