= Oxylymma =

Scientific classification
- Domain: Eukaryota
- Kingdom: Animalia
- Phylum: Arthropoda
- Class: Insecta
- Order: Coleoptera
- Suborder: Polyphaga
- Infraorder: Cucujiformia
- Family: Cerambycidae
- Tribe: Rhinotragini
- Genus: Oxylymma; Pascoe, 1859

Genus of beetles

Oxylymma is a genus of beetles in the family Cerambycidae. The genus occurs in Central and South America, from Guatemala to Bolivia and Brazil.

== Species ==
Oxylymma contains the following species:

- Oxylymma birai Wappes & Santos-Silva 2019
- Oxylymma caeruleocincta Bates, 1885
- Oxylymma championi Bates, 1885
- Oxylymma durantoni Penaherrera-Leiva & Tavakilian, 2003
- Oxylymma faurei Penaherrera-Leiva & Tavakilian, 2003
- Oxylymma gibbicollis Bates, 1873
- Oxylymma lepida Pascoe, 1859
- Oxylymma pallida Santos-Silva, Bezark & Martins 2012
- Oxylymma rileyi Heffern, Botero & Santos-Silva 2020
- Oxylymma soniae Wappes & Santos-Silva 2019
- Oxylymma sudrei Penaherrera-Leiva & Tavakilian, 2003
- Oxylymma surinamensis Wappes & Santos-Silva 2019
- Oxylymma telephorina Bates, 1870
- Oxylymma tuberculicolle Fisher, 1947
