= Sphecomorpha chalybea =

Scientific classification
- Kingdom: Animalia
- Phylum: Arthropoda
- Class: Insecta
- Order: Coleoptera
- Suborder: Polyphaga
- Infraorder: Cucujiformia
- Family: Cerambycidae
- Genus: Sphecomorpha
- Species: S. chalybea

Binomial name
- Sphecomorpha chalybea Newman, 1838

Species of beetle

Sphecomorpha chalybea is a species of beetle in the family Cerambycidae. It was described by Newman in 1838.
