= Crossomeles =

Scientific classification
- Domain: Eukaryota
- Kingdom: Animalia
- Phylum: Arthropoda
- Class: Insecta
- Order: Coleoptera
- Suborder: Polyphaga
- Infraorder: Cucujiformia
- Family: Cerambycidae
- Subfamily: Cerambycinae
- Tribe: Rhinotragini
- Genus: Crossomeles; Chemsak & Noguera, 1993

Genus of beetles

Crossomeles is a genus of beetles in the family Cerambycidae, first described by Chemsak & Noguera in 1993.

== Species ==
Crossomeles contains the following species:

- Crossomeles acutipennis Chemsak & Noguera, 1993
- Crossomeles aureopilis (Fisher, 1953)
- Crossomeles copei Nearns & Swift, 2022
- Crossomeles oscarcastilloi Nearns & Swift, 2022
