= Erythroplatys corallifer =

Scientific classification
- Domain: Eukaryota
- Kingdom: Animalia
- Phylum: Arthropoda
- Class: Insecta
- Order: Coleoptera
- Suborder: Polyphaga
- Infraorder: Cucujiformia
- Family: Cerambycidae
- Genus: Erythroplatys
- Species: E. corallifer

Binomial name
- Erythroplatys corallifer White, 1855

Species of beetle

Erythroplatys corallifer is a species of beetle in the family Cerambycidae. It was described by White in 1855.
