= Bromiades =

Scientific classification
- Domain: Eukaryota
- Kingdom: Animalia
- Phylum: Arthropoda
- Class: Insecta
- Order: Coleoptera
- Suborder: Polyphaga
- Infraorder: Cucujiformia
- Family: Cerambycidae
- Tribe: Rhinotragini
- Genus: Bromiades; Thomson, 1864
- Species: B. brachyptera

Binomial name
- Bromiades brachyptera (Chevrolat in Guérin-Méneville, 1838)

Synonyms
- Odontocera brachyptera Chevrolat, 1838; Bromiades meridionalis Fisher, 1930

Genus of beetles

Bromiades is monotypic genus of beetles in the family Cerambycidae. The sole species is Bromiades brachyptera. It occurs in southern Mexico (Chiapas), Cuba, Central America, and Colombia.
