= Sphecomorpha murina =

Scientific classification
- Kingdom: Animalia
- Phylum: Arthropoda
- Class: Insecta
- Order: Coleoptera
- Suborder: Polyphaga
- Infraorder: Cucujiformia
- Family: Cerambycidae
- Genus: Sphecomorpha
- Species: S. murina

Binomial name
- Sphecomorpha murina (Klug, 1825)

Species of beetle

Sphecomorpha murina is a species of beetle in the family Cerambycidae. It was described and recorded by Johann Christoph Friedrich Klug in 1825.
