= Stenopseustes =

Scientific classification
- Kingdom: Animalia
- Phylum: Arthropoda
- Class: Insecta
- Order: Coleoptera
- Suborder: Polyphaga
- Infraorder: Cucujiformia
- Family: Cerambycidae
- Tribe: Rhinotragini
- Genus: Stenopseustes

Genus of beetles

Stenopseustes is a genus of beetles in the family Cerambycidae, containing the following species:

- Stenopseustes aeger Bates, 1873
- Stenopseustes gibbicollis Fisher, 1947
- Stenopseustes sericinus Bates, 1880
