= Corallancyla durantoni =

Scientific classification
- Domain: Eukaryota
- Kingdom: Animalia
- Phylum: Arthropoda
- Class: Insecta
- Order: Coleoptera
- Suborder: Polyphaga
- Infraorder: Cucujiformia
- Family: Cerambycidae
- Genus: Corallancyla
- Species: C. durantoni

Binomial name
- Corallancyla durantoni Penaherrera-Leiva & Tavakilian, 2003

Species of beetle

Corallancyla durantoni is a species of beetle in the family Cerambycidae. It was described by Penaherrera-Leiva and Tavakilian in 2003.
