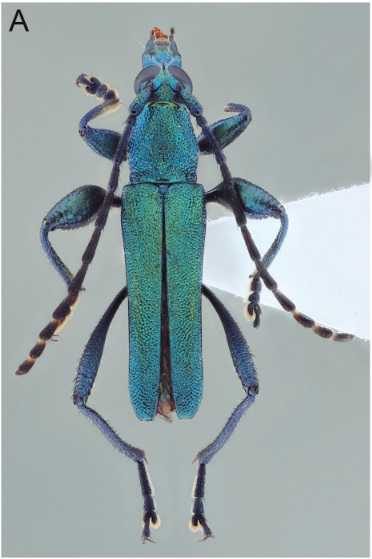

Scientific classification
- Kingdom: Animalia
- Phylum: Arthropoda
- Clade: Pancrustacea
- Class: Insecta
- Order: Coleoptera
- Suborder: Polyphaga
- Infraorder: Cucujiformia
- Family: Cerambycidae
- Subfamily: Cerambycinae
- Tribe: Rhinotragini
- Genus: Grupiara; Martins & Santos-Silva, 2010
- Species: G. viridis

Binomial name
- Grupiara viridis (Gounelle, 1911)

Synonyms
- Ommata (Agaone) viridis Gounelle, 1911

= Grupiara viridis =

Genus of beetles

Grupiara viridis is a species of beetle in the family Cerambycidae, the only species in the genus Grupiara. It is found in Bolivia, Brazil (Bahia, Goiás, Minas Gerais, Espirito Santo, Rio de Janeiro, São Paulo, Paraná, Santa Catarina, Rio Grande do Sul), Paraguay and Argentina.
