= Optomerus =

Scientific classification
- Kingdom: Animalia
- Phylum: Arthropoda
- Class: Insecta
- Order: Coleoptera
- Suborder: Polyphaga
- Infraorder: Cucujiformia
- Family: Cerambycidae
- Tribe: Rhinotragini
- Genus: Optomerus

Genus of beetles

Optomerus is a genus of beetles in the family Cerambycidae. They are described as dark brown to black. The genus contains the following species:

- Optomerus bispeculifer (White, 1855)
- Optomerus roppai (Magno, 1995)
