= Stultutragus nigricornis =

Scientific classification
- Kingdom: Animalia
- Phylum: Arthropoda
- Class: Insecta
- Order: Coleoptera
- Suborder: Polyphaga
- Infraorder: Cucujiformia
- Family: Cerambycidae
- Genus: Stultutragus
- Species: S. nigricornis

Binomial name
- Stultutragus nigricornis Fisher, 1947

Species of beetle

Stultutragus nigricornis is a species of beetle in the family Cerambycidae. It was described by Fisher in 1947.
