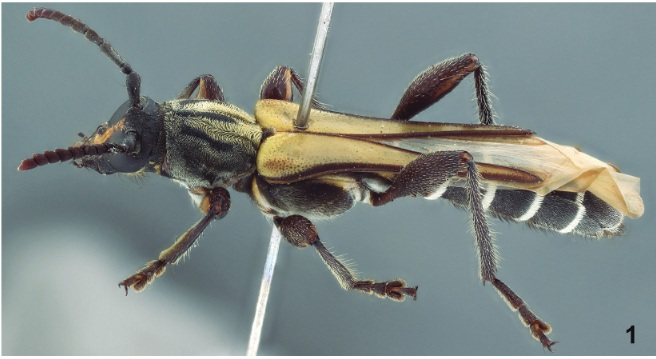

Scientific classification
- Kingdom: Animalia
- Phylum: Arthropoda
- Class: Insecta
- Order: Coleoptera
- Suborder: Polyphaga
- Infraorder: Cucujiformia
- Family: Cerambycidae
- Genus: Acutiphoderes
- Species: A. necydalea

Binomial name
- Acutiphoderes necydalea (Linnaeus, 1758)

Synonyms
- Leptura necydalea Linnaeus, 1758; Isthmiade necydalea; Necydalis glaucescens Linné, 1767; Necydalis nitida Degeer, 1775; Acyphoderes odyneroides White, 1855

= Acutiphoderes necydalea =

Species of beetle

Acutiphoderes necydalea is a species of beetle in the family Cerambycidae. It was described by Carl Linnaeus in his landmark 1758 10th edition of Systema Naturae. This species is found in Ecuador, Peru, Suriname, Guyana, Brazil.
