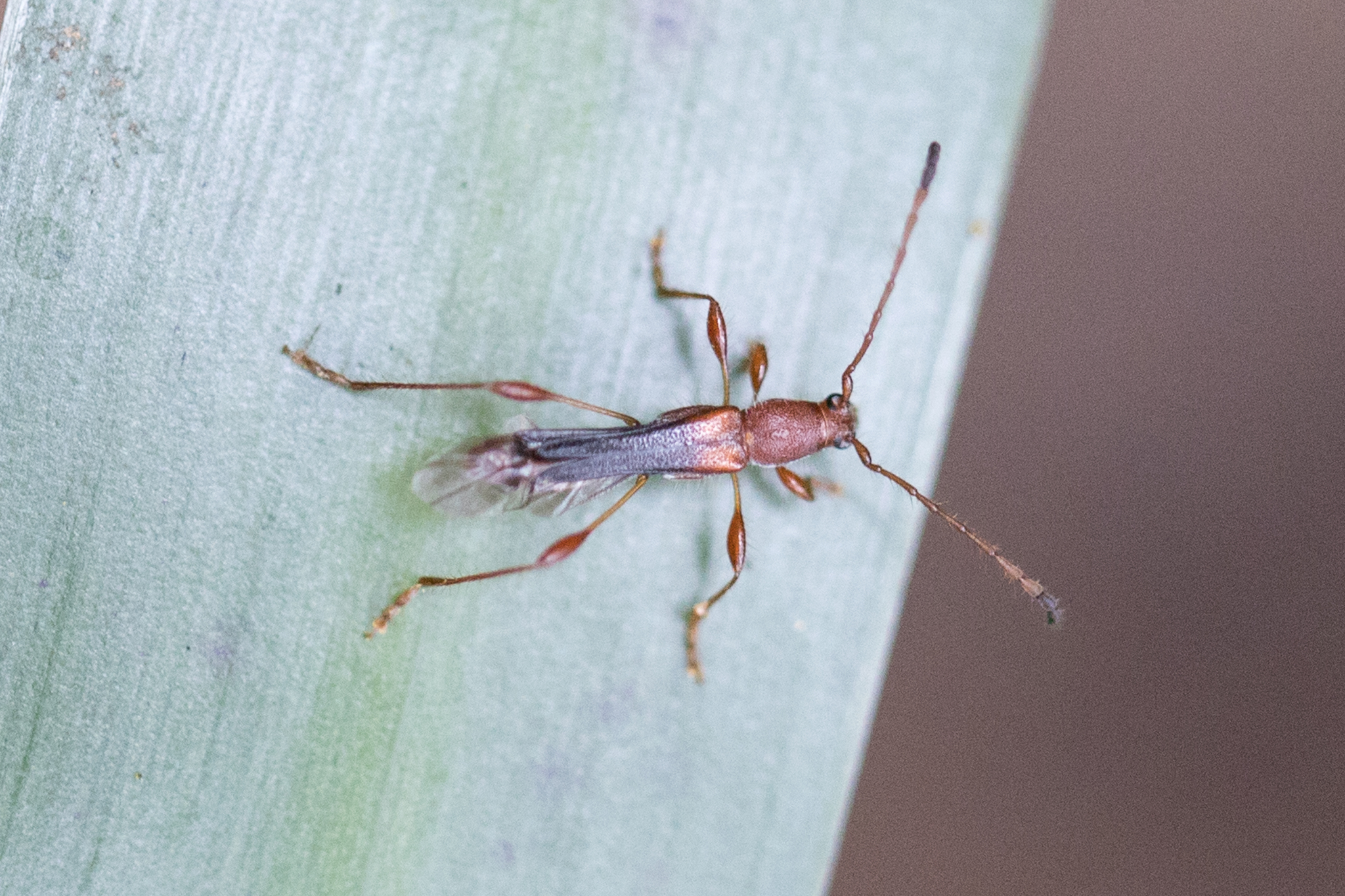

Scientific classification
- Kingdom: Animalia
- Phylum: Arthropoda
- Clade: Pancrustacea
- Class: Insecta
- Order: Coleoptera
- Suborder: Polyphaga
- Infraorder: Cucujiformia
- Family: Cerambycidae
- Genus: Lygrocharis
- Species: L. nigripennis

Binomial name
- Lygrocharis nigripennis Mendes, 1938

= Lygrocharis nigripennis =

Species of beetle

Lygrocharis nigripennis is a species of beetle in the family Cerambycidae. It was first described by Dario Mendes. (Note: Mendes, Dario, Três espécies novas de cerambycideos do Brasil, dos gêneros Lygrocharis, Rhathymoscelis e Alphus (Coleoptera) Jan 1938 117-121)
