= Acatinga maia =

Scientific classification
- Domain: Eukaryota
- Kingdom: Animalia
- Phylum: Arthropoda
- Class: Insecta
- Order: Coleoptera
- Suborder: Polyphaga
- Infraorder: Cucujiformia
- Family: Cerambycidae
- Genus: Acatinga
- Species: A. maia

Binomial name
- Acatinga maia (Newman, 1841)

Species of beetle

Acatinga maia is a species of beetle in the family Cerambycidae. It was described by Newman in 1841.
