= Pandrosos (beetle) =

Scientific classification
- Kingdom: Animalia
- Phylum: Arthropoda
- Class: Insecta
- Order: Coleoptera
- Suborder: Polyphaga
- Infraorder: Cucujiformia
- Family: Cerambycidae
- Tribe: Rhinotragini
- Genus: Pandrosos

Genus of beetles

Pandrosos is a genus of beetles in the family Cerambycidae, containing the following species:

- Pandrosos phthisicus (Klug, 1825)
- Pandrosos proximus Mermudes & Napp, 2009
