= Optomerus roppai =

Scientific classification
- Kingdom: Animalia
- Phylum: Arthropoda
- Class: Insecta
- Order: Coleoptera
- Suborder: Polyphaga
- Infraorder: Cucujiformia
- Family: Cerambycidae
- Genus: Optomerus
- Species: O. roppai

Binomial name
- Optomerus roppai (Magno, 1995)

Species of beetle

Optomerus roppai is a species of beetle in the family Cerambycidae. It was described by Magno in 1995.
