= Paraeclipta =

Scientific classification
- Kingdom: Animalia
- Phylum: Arthropoda
- Class: Insecta
- Order: Coleoptera
- Suborder: Polyphaga
- Infraorder: Cucujiformia
- Family: Cerambycidae
- Subfamily: Cerambycinae
- Tribe: Rhinotragini
- Genus: Paraeclipta; Clarke, 2011

Genus of beetles

Paraeclipta is a genus of beetles in the family Cerambycidae, containing the following species:

- Paraeclipta bicoloripes (Zajciw, 1965)
- Paraeclipta cabrujai Clarke, 2011
- Paraeclipta clementecruzi Clarke, 2011
- Paraeclipta croceicornis (Gounelle, 1911)
- Paraeclipta flavipes (Melzer, 1922)
- Paraeclipta jejuna (Gounelle, 1911)
- Paraeclipta kawensis (Penaherrera-Leiva & Tavakilian, 2004)
- Paraeclipta longipennis (Fisher, 1947)
- Paraeclipta melgarae Clarke, 2011
- Paraeclipta moscosoi Clarke, 2011
- Paraeclipta rectipennis (Zajciw, 1965)
- Paraeclipta soumourouensis (Tavakilian & Penaherrera-Leiva, 2003)
- Paraeclipta tenuis (Burmeister, 1865)
- Paraeclipta tomhacketti Clarke, 2011
- Paraeclipta unicoloripes (Zajciw, 1965)
