= Oxylymma faurei =

Scientific classification
- Domain: Eukaryota
- Kingdom: Animalia
- Phylum: Arthropoda
- Class: Insecta
- Order: Coleoptera
- Suborder: Polyphaga
- Infraorder: Cucujiformia
- Family: Cerambycidae
- Genus: Oxylymma
- Species: O. faurei

Binomial name
- Oxylymma faurei Peñaherrera-Leiva & Tavakilian, 2003

Species of beetle

Oxylymma faurei is a species of beetle in the family Cerambycidae. It was described by Peñaherrera-Leiva and Tavakilian in 2003. It occurs in French Guiana.
