= Corallancyla =

Scientific classification
- Domain: Eukaryota
- Kingdom: Animalia
- Phylum: Arthropoda
- Class: Insecta
- Order: Coleoptera
- Suborder: Polyphaga
- Infraorder: Cucujiformia
- Family: Cerambycidae
- Subfamily: Cerambycinae
- Tribe: Rhinotragini
- Genus: Corallancyla; Tippmann, 1960

Species
- See text

Genus of beetles

Corallancyla is a genus of beetles in the family Cerambycidae.

== Species ==
The genus contains the following species:

- Corallancyla durantoni Penaherrera-Leiva & Tavakilian, 2003
- Corallancyla neotropica Tippmann, 1960
