= Chariergodes turrialbae =

Scientific classification
- Kingdom: Animalia
- Phylum: Arthropoda
- Class: Insecta
- Order: Coleoptera
- Suborder: Polyphaga
- Infraorder: Cucujiformia
- Family: Cerambycidae
- Genus: Chariergodes
- Species: C. turrialbae

Binomial name
- Chariergodes turrialbae (Giesbert, 1991)

Species of beetle

Chariergodes turrialbae is a species of beetle in the family Cerambycidae. It was described by Giesbert in 1991.
