= Lygrocharis neivai =

Scientific classification
- Kingdom: Animalia
- Phylum: Arthropoda
- Class: Insecta
- Order: Coleoptera
- Suborder: Polyphaga
- Infraorder: Cucujiformia
- Family: Cerambycidae
- Genus: Lygrocharis
- Species: L. neivai

Binomial name
- Lygrocharis neivai Melzer, 1927

Species of beetle

Lygrocharis neivai is a species of beetle in the family Cerambycidae.
