= Rhopalessa durantoni =

Scientific classification
- Kingdom: Animalia
- Phylum: Arthropoda
- Class: Insecta
- Order: Coleoptera
- Suborder: Polyphaga
- Infraorder: Cucujiformia
- Family: Cerambycidae
- Genus: Rhopalessa
- Species: R. durantoni

Binomial name
- Rhopalessa durantoni (Penaherrera-Leiva & Tavakilian, 2004)

Species of beetle

Rhopalessa durantoni is a species of beetle in the family Cerambycidae. It was described by Penaherrera-Leiva and Tavakilian in 2004.
