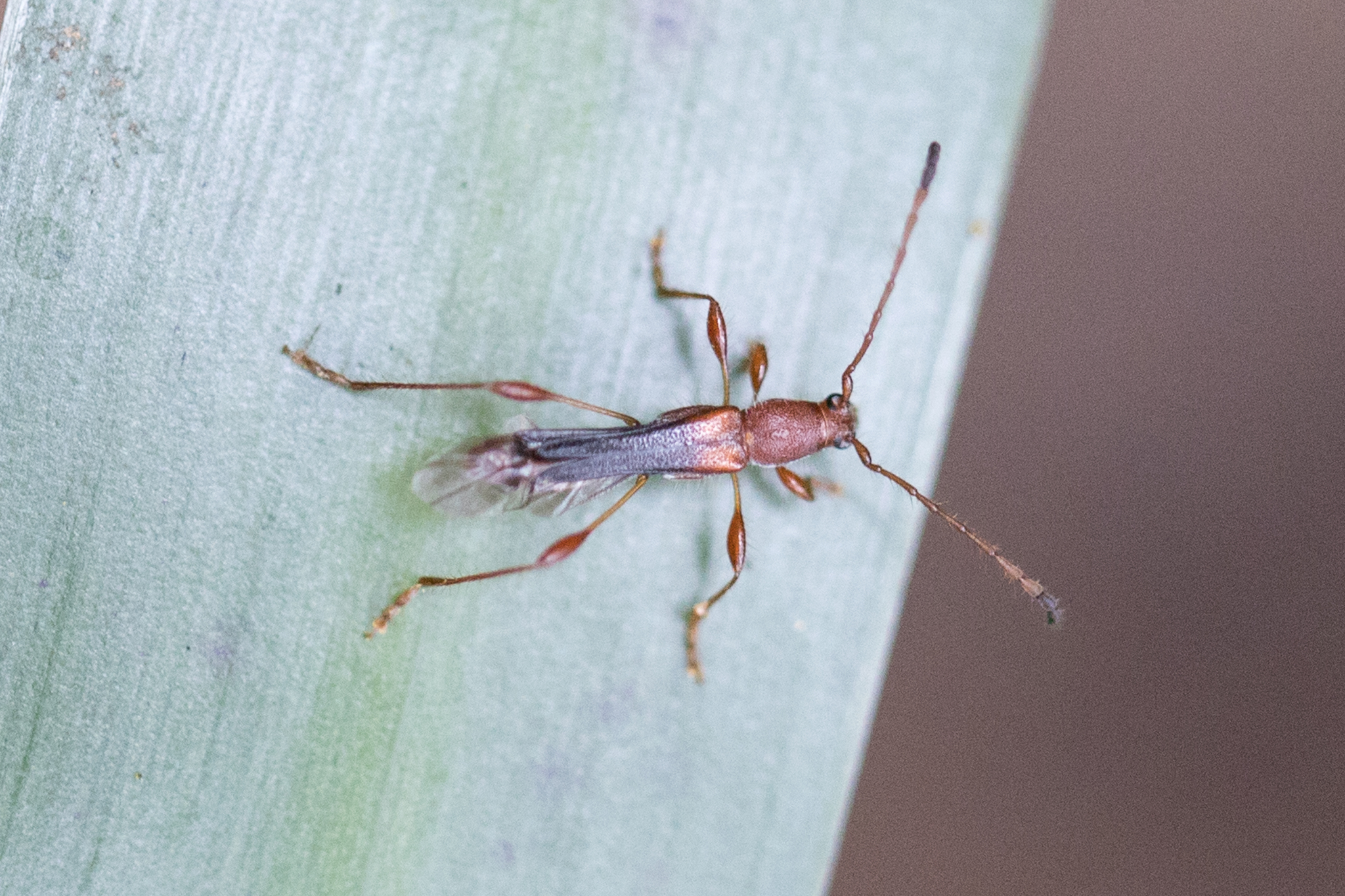
- Lygrocharis nigripennis

Scientific classification
- Kingdom: Animalia
- Phylum: Arthropoda
- Clade: Pancrustacea
- Class: Insecta
- Order: Coleoptera
- Suborder: Polyphaga
- Infraorder: Cucujiformia
- Family: Cerambycidae
- Tribe: Rhinotragini
- Genus: Lygrocharis; Melzer, 1927

= Lygrocharis =

Genus of beetles

Lygrocharis is a genus of beetles in the family Cerambycidae, containing the following species:

- Lygrocharis neivai Melzer, 1927
- Lygrocharis nigripennis Mendes, 1938
