= Paraeclipta tomhacketti =

Scientific classification
- Kingdom: Animalia
- Phylum: Arthropoda
- Class: Insecta
- Order: Coleoptera
- Suborder: Polyphaga
- Infraorder: Cucujiformia
- Family: Cerambycidae
- Genus: Paraeclipta
- Species: P. tomhacketti

Binomial name
- Paraeclipta tomhacketti Clarke, 2011

Species of beetle

Paraeclipta tomhacketti is a species of beetle in the family Cerambycidae. It was described by Clarke in 2011.
