= Acutiphoderes =

Scientific classification
- Domain: Eukaryota
- Kingdom: Animalia
- Phylum: Arthropoda
- Class: Insecta
- Order: Coleoptera
- Suborder: Polyphaga
- Infraorder: Cucujiformia
- Family: Cerambycidae
- Tribe: Rhinotragini
- Genus: Acutiphoderes; Clarke, 2015

Genus of beetles

Acutiphoderes is a genus of beetles in the family Cerambycidae.

== Species ==
- Acutiphoderes baeri (Gounelle, 1913)
- Acutiphoderes necydalea (Linné, 1758)
