= Xenocrasis politipennis =

Scientific classification
- Kingdom: Animalia
- Phylum: Arthropoda
- Class: Insecta
- Order: Coleoptera
- Suborder: Polyphaga
- Infraorder: Cucujiformia
- Family: Cerambycidae
- Genus: Xenocrasis
- Species: X. politipennis

Binomial name
- Xenocrasis politipennis (Zajciw, 1971)

Species of beetle

Xenocrasis politipennis is a species of beetle in the family Cerambycidae. It was described by Zajciw in 1971.
