= Laedorcari fulvicollis =

Scientific classification
- Kingdom: Animalia
- Phylum: Arthropoda
- Class: Insecta
- Order: Coleoptera
- Suborder: Polyphaga
- Infraorder: Cucujiformia
- Family: Cerambycidae
- Genus: Laedorcari
- Species: L. fulvicollis

Binomial name
- Laedorcari fulvicollis (Lacordaire, 1869)

Species of beetle

Laedorcari fulvicollis is a species of beetle in the family Cerambycidae.
