= Thouvenotiana =

Scientific classification
- Domain: Eukaryota
- Kingdom: Animalia
- Phylum: Arthropoda
- Class: Insecta
- Order: Coleoptera
- Suborder: Polyphaga
- Infraorder: Cucujiformia
- Family: Cerambycidae
- Tribe: Rhinotragini
- Genus: Thouvenotiana; Peñaherrera & Tavakilian, 2003
- Species: T. ichneumona

Binomial name
- Thouvenotiana ichneumona Peñaherrera & Tavakilian, 2003

Genus of beetles

Thouvenotiana is a genus of longhorned beetles in the family Cerambycidae. This genus has a single species, Thouvenotiana ichneumona, found in French Guiana.
