= Parischasia =

Scientific classification
- Kingdom: Animalia
- Phylum: Arthropoda
- Class: Insecta
- Order: Coleoptera
- Suborder: Polyphaga
- Infraorder: Cucujiformia
- Family: Cerambycidae
- Tribe: Rhinotragini
- Genus: Parischasia

Genus of beetles

Parischasia is a genus of beetles in the family Cerambycidae, containing the following species:

- Parischasia chamenoisi Tavakilian & Peñaherrera-Leiva, 2005
- Parischasia ligulatipennis (Gounelle, 1911)
