= Sphecomorpha vespiventris =

Scientific classification
- Kingdom: Animalia
- Phylum: Arthropoda
- Class: Insecta
- Order: Coleoptera
- Suborder: Polyphaga
- Infraorder: Cucujiformia
- Family: Cerambycidae
- Genus: Sphecomorpha
- Species: S. vespiventris

Binomial name
- Sphecomorpha vespiventris (Bates, 1880)

Species of beetle

Sphecomorpha vespiventris is a species of beetle in the family Cerambycidae. It was described by Henry Walter Bates in 1880.
