= Paraeclipta jejuna =

Scientific classification
- Kingdom: Animalia
- Phylum: Arthropoda
- Class: Insecta
- Order: Coleoptera
- Suborder: Polyphaga
- Infraorder: Cucujiformia
- Family: Cerambycidae
- Genus: Paraeclipta
- Species: P. jejuna

Binomial name
- Paraeclipta jejuna (Gounelle, 1911)

Species of beetle

Paraeclipta jejuna is a species of beetle in the family Cerambycidae. It was described by Gounelle in 1911.
