= Pseudagaone cerdai =

Scientific classification
- Kingdom: Animalia
- Phylum: Arthropoda
- Class: Insecta
- Order: Coleoptera
- Suborder: Polyphaga
- Infraorder: Cucujiformia
- Family: Cerambycidae
- Genus: Pseudagaone
- Species: P. cerdai

Binomial name
- Pseudagaone cerdai (Tavakilian & Penaherrera-Leiva, 2007)

Species of beetle

Pseudagaone cerdai is a species of beetle in the family Cerambycidae. It was described by Tavakilian and Penaherrera-Leiva in 2007.
