= Pyrpotyra pytinga =

Scientific classification
- Domain: Eukaryota
- Kingdom: Animalia
- Phylum: Arthropoda
- Class: Insecta
- Order: Coleoptera
- Suborder: Polyphaga
- Infraorder: Cucujiformia
- Family: Cerambycidae
- Genus: Pyrpotyra
- Species: P. pytinga

Binomial name
- Pyrpotyra pytinga Santos-Silva, Martins & Clarke, 2010

Species of beetle

Pyrpotyra pytinga is a species of beetle in the family Cerambycidae. It was described by Santos-Silva, Martins and Clarke in 2010.
