= Neophygopoda nigritarsis =

Scientific classification
- Domain: Eukaryota
- Kingdom: Animalia
- Phylum: Arthropoda
- Class: Insecta
- Order: Coleoptera
- Suborder: Polyphaga
- Infraorder: Cucujiformia
- Family: Cerambycidae
- Genus: Neophygopoda
- Species: N. nigritarsis

Binomial name
- Neophygopoda nigritarsis (Gounelle, 1911)

Synonyms
- Phygopoda nigritarsis Gounelle, 1911

Species of beetle

Neophygopoda nigritarsis is a species of beetle in the family Cerambycidae. It was described by Gounelle in 1911.
