= Paraeclipta unicoloripes =

Scientific classification
- Kingdom: Animalia
- Phylum: Arthropoda
- Class: Insecta
- Order: Coleoptera
- Suborder: Polyphaga
- Infraorder: Cucujiformia
- Family: Cerambycidae
- Genus: Paraeclipta
- Species: P. unicoloripes

Binomial name
- Paraeclipta unicoloripes (Zajciw, 1965)

Species of beetle

Paraeclipta unicoloripes is a species of beetle in the family Cerambycidae. It was described by Zajciw in 1965.
