= Chrysommata lauracea =

Scientific classification
- Domain: Eukaryota
- Kingdom: Animalia
- Phylum: Arthropoda
- Class: Insecta
- Order: Coleoptera
- Suborder: Polyphaga
- Infraorder: Cucujiformia
- Family: Cerambycidae
- Genus: Chrysommata
- Species: C. lauracea

Binomial name
- Chrysommata lauracea (Penaherrera-Leiva & Tavakilian, 2003)

Synonyms
- Ommata lauracea Peñaherrera & Tavakilian, 2003 (Tavakilian & Peñaherrera, 2007)

Species of beetle

Chrysommata lauracea is a species of beetle in the family Cerambycidae. It was described by Penaherrera-Leiva and Tavakilian in 2003.
