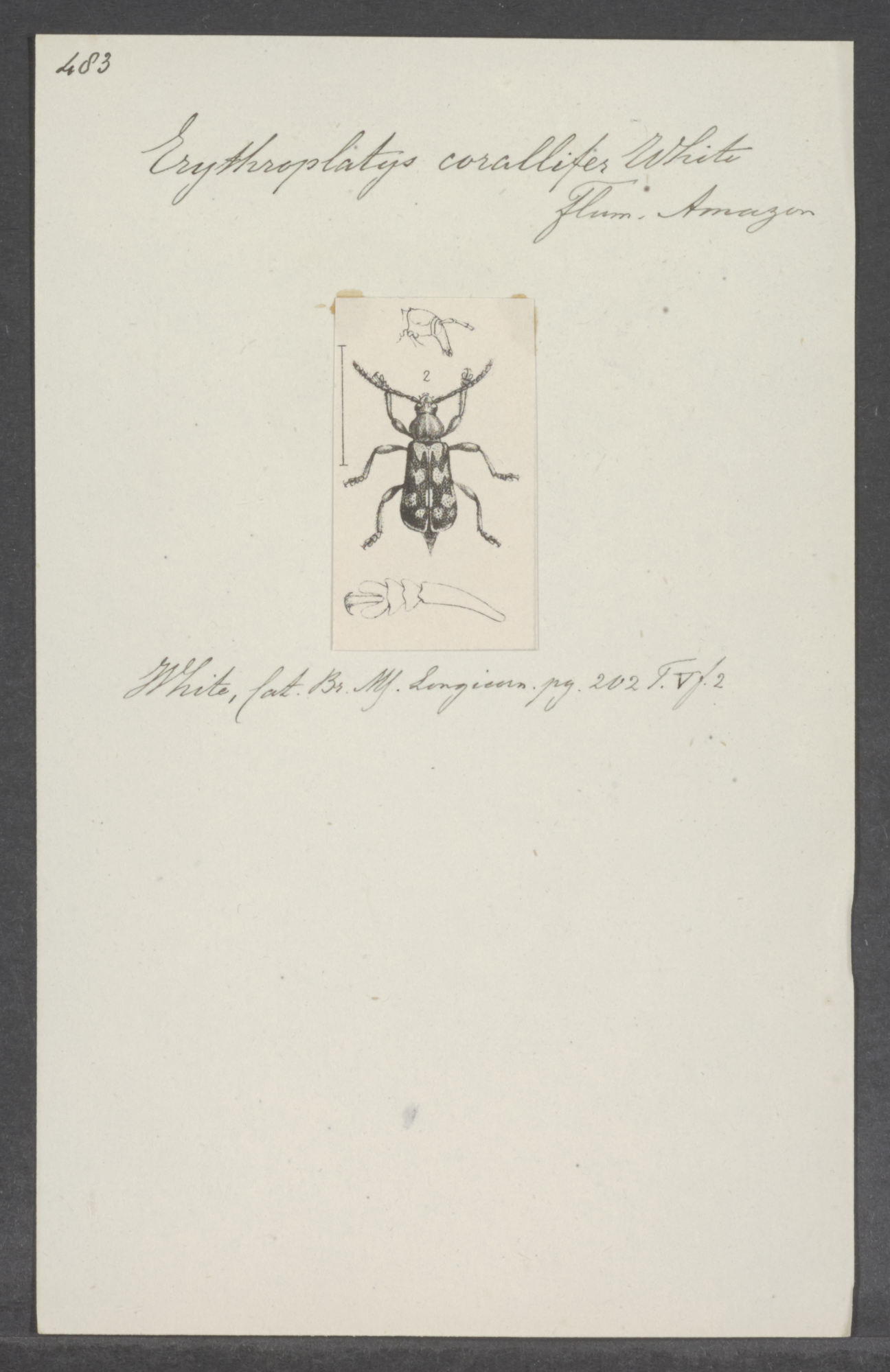
- Erythroplatys corallifer

Scientific classification
- Domain: Eukaryota
- Kingdom: Animalia
- Phylum: Arthropoda
- Class: Insecta
- Order: Coleoptera
- Suborder: Polyphaga
- Infraorder: Cucujiformia
- Family: Cerambycidae
- Subfamily: Cerambycinae
- Tribe: Rhinotragini
- Genus: Erythroplatys; White, 1855

= Erythroplatys =

Genus of beetles

Erythroplatys is a genus of beetles in the family Cerambycidae, containing the following species:

- Erythroplatys boliviensis Clarke, 2012
- Erythroplatys cardinalis Monné & Fragoso, 1990
- Erythroplatys corallifer White, 1855
- Erythroplatys rugosus (Lucas, 1857)
- Erythroplatys simulator Gounelle, 1911
