= Ecliptophanes tommyi =

Scientific classification
- Kingdom: Animalia
- Phylum: Arthropoda
- Class: Insecta
- Order: Coleoptera
- Suborder: Polyphaga
- Infraorder: Cucujiformia
- Family: Cerambycidae
- Genus: Ecliptophanes
- Species: E. tommyi

Binomial name
- Ecliptophanes tommyi (Hovore, 1989)

Species of beetle

Ecliptophanes tommyi is a species of beetle in the family Cerambycidae. It was described by Hovore in 1989.
