= Oxylymma tuberculicolle =

Scientific classification
- Kingdom: Animalia
- Phylum: Arthropoda
- Class: Insecta
- Order: Coleoptera
- Suborder: Polyphaga
- Infraorder: Cucujiformia
- Family: Cerambycidae
- Genus: Oxylymma
- Species: O. tuberculicolle

Binomial name
- Oxylymma tuberculicolle Fisher, 1947

Synonyms
- Oxylymma tuberculicollis Fisher, 1947

Species of beetle

Oxylymma tuberculicolle is a species of beetle in the family Cerambycidae. It was described by Fisher in 1947. It occurs in Panama and Costa Rica.
