= Stenopseustes aeger =

Scientific classification
- Kingdom: Animalia
- Phylum: Arthropoda
- Class: Insecta
- Order: Coleoptera
- Suborder: Polyphaga
- Infraorder: Cucujiformia
- Family: Cerambycidae
- Genus: Stenopseustes
- Species: S. aeger

Binomial name
- Stenopseustes aeger Bates, 1873

Species of beetle

Stenopseustes aeger is a species of beetle in the family Cerambycidae. It was described by Henry Walter Bates in 1873.
