= Phygopoda =

Scientific classification
- Domain: Eukaryota
- Kingdom: Animalia
- Phylum: Arthropoda
- Class: Insecta
- Order: Coleoptera
- Suborder: Polyphaga
- Infraorder: Cucujiformia
- Family: Cerambycidae
- Subfamily: Cerambycinae
- Tribe: Rhinotragini
- Genus: Phygopoda; Thomson, 1864

Genus of beetles

Phygopoda is a genus of beetles in the family Cerambycidae.

== Species ==
Phygopoda contains the following species:

- Phygopoda agdae (Martins, Galileo & Santos-Silva, 2015)
- Phygopoda birai Wappes & Santos-Silva, 2021
- Phygopoda boliviensis Clarke, 2017
- Phygopoda carellii Wappes & Santos-Silva, 2021
- Phygopoda chaquensis Clarke, 2017
- Phygopoda exilis (Melzer, 1933)
- Phygopoda fugax Thomson, 1864
- Phygopoda fulvitarsis Gounelle, 1911
- Phygopoda hirsuta Wappes & Santos-Silva, 2021
- Phygopoda ingae Penaherrera-Leiva & Tavakilian, 2004
- Phygopoda jacobi Fuchs, 1961
- Phygopoda longiscopifera Clarke, 2017
