= Stultutragus maytaybaphilus =

Scientific classification
- Kingdom: Animalia
- Phylum: Arthropoda
- Class: Insecta
- Order: Coleoptera
- Suborder: Polyphaga
- Infraorder: Cucujiformia
- Family: Cerambycidae
- Genus: Stultutragus
- Species: S. maytaybaphilus

Binomial name
- Stultutragus maytaybaphilus Clarke, 2010

Species of beetle

Stultutragus maytaybaphilus is a species of beetle in the family Cerambycidae. It was described by Clarke in 2010.
