= Pandrosos phthisicus =

Scientific classification
- Kingdom: Animalia
- Phylum: Arthropoda
- Class: Insecta
- Order: Coleoptera
- Suborder: Polyphaga
- Infraorder: Cucujiformia
- Family: Cerambycidae
- Genus: Pandrosos
- Species: P. phthisicus

Binomial name
- Pandrosos phthisicus (Klug, 1825)

Species of beetle

Pandrosos phthisicus is a species of beetle in the family Cerambycidae. It was described by Johann Christoph Friedrich Klug in 1825.
