= Stultutragus cerdai =

Scientific classification
- Kingdom: Animalia
- Phylum: Arthropoda
- Class: Insecta
- Order: Coleoptera
- Suborder: Polyphaga
- Infraorder: Cucujiformia
- Family: Cerambycidae
- Genus: Stultutragus
- Species: S. cerdai

Binomial name
- Stultutragus cerdai (Penaherrera-Leiva & Tavakilian, 2003)

Species of beetle

Stultutragus cerdai is a species of beetle in the family Cerambycidae. It was described by Penaherrera-Leiva and Tavakilian in 2003.
