= Phygopoides =

Scientific classification
- Kingdom: Animalia
- Phylum: Arthropoda
- Class: Insecta
- Order: Coleoptera
- Suborder: Polyphaga
- Infraorder: Cucujiformia
- Family: Cerambycidae
- Tribe: Rhinotragini
- Genus: Phygopoides

Genus of beetles

Phygopoides is a genus of beetles in the family Cerambycidae, containing the following species:

- Phygopoides pradosiae Penaherrera-Leiva & Tavakilian, 2003
- Phygopoides talisiaphila Penaherrera-Leiva & Tavakilian, 2003
