= Neophygopoda tibialis =

Scientific classification
- Kingdom: Animalia
- Phylum: Arthropoda
- Class: Insecta
- Order: Coleoptera
- Suborder: Polyphaga
- Infraorder: Cucujiformia
- Family: Cerambycidae
- Genus: Neophygopoda
- Species: N. tibialis

Binomial name
- Neophygopoda tibialis Melzer, 1933

Species of beetle

Neophygopoda tibialis is a species of beetle in the family Cerambycidae.
