= Aechmutes lycoides =

Scientific classification
- Domain: Eukaryota
- Kingdom: Animalia
- Phylum: Arthropoda
- Class: Insecta
- Order: Coleoptera
- Suborder: Polyphaga
- Infraorder: Cucujiformia
- Family: Cerambycidae
- Genus: Aechmutes
- Species: A. lycoides

Binomial name
- Aechmutes lycoides Bates, 1867

Species of beetle

Aechmutes lycoides is a species of beetle in the family Cerambycidae. It was described by Henry Walter Bates in 1867.
