= Etimasu =

Etimasu cosmipes

Scientific classification
- Kingdom: Animalia
- Phylum: Arthropoda
- Clade: Pancrustacea
- Class: Insecta
- Order: Coleoptera
- Suborder: Polyphaga
- Infraorder: Cucujiformia
- Family: Cerambycidae
- Tribe: Rhinotragini
- Genus: Etimasu; Santos-Silva, Martins & Clarke 2010
- Species: E. cosmipes

Binomial name
- Etimasu cosmipes (Peñaherrera-Leiva & Tavakilian, 2003)

Synonyms
- Ommata cosmipes Peñaherrera-Leiva & Tavakilian, 2003

Genus of beetles

Etimasu cosmipes is a species of beetle in the family Cerambycidae, the only species in the genus Etimasu. It occurs in French Guiana and Brazil.
