= Oregostoma puniceum =

Scientific classification
- Kingdom: Animalia
- Phylum: Arthropoda
- Class: Insecta
- Order: Coleoptera
- Suborder: Polyphaga
- Infraorder: Cucujiformia
- Family: Cerambycidae
- Genus: Oregostoma
- Species: O. puniceum

Binomial name
- Oregostoma puniceum (Newman, 1838)

Species of beetle

Oregostoma puniceum is a species of beetle in the family Cerambycidae. It was described by Newman in 1838.
