= Neoregostoma giesberti =

Scientific classification
- Domain: Eukaryota
- Kingdom: Animalia
- Phylum: Arthropoda
- Class: Insecta
- Order: Coleoptera
- Suborder: Polyphaga
- Infraorder: Cucujiformia
- Family: Cerambycidae
- Genus: Neoregostoma
- Species: N. giesberti

Binomial name
- Neoregostoma giesberti Clarke, 2007

Species of beetle

Neoregostoma giesberti is a species of beetle in the family Cerambycidae.
