= Stultutragus fenestratus =

Scientific classification
- Kingdom: Animalia
- Phylum: Arthropoda
- Clade: Pancrustacea
- Class: Insecta
- Order: Coleoptera
- Suborder: Polyphaga
- Infraorder: Cucujiformia
- Family: Cerambycidae
- Genus: Stultutragus
- Species: S. fenestratus

Binomial name
- Stultutragus fenestratus (H. Lucas, 1857)

Species of beetle

Stultutragus fenestratus is a species of beetle in the family Cerambycidae. It was described by Hippolyte Lucas in 1857. It is found in Brazil (Goiás, Bahia, Minas Gerais, Espírito Santo, Rio de Janeiro, São Paulo, Santa Catarina) and Paraguay.
