= Stultutragus =

Scientific classification
- Kingdom: Animalia
- Phylum: Arthropoda
- Class: Insecta
- Order: Coleoptera
- Suborder: Polyphaga
- Infraorder: Cucujiformia
- Family: Cerambycidae
- Subfamily: Cerambycinae
- Tribe: Rhinotragini
- Genus: Stultutragus; Clarke, 2010

Genus of beetles

Stultutragus is a genus of beetles in the family Cerambycidae, containing the following species:

- Stultutragus bifasciatus (Zajciw, 1965)
- Stultutragus cerdai (Penaherrera-Leiva & Tavakilian, 2003)
- Stultutragus crotonaphilus Clarke, 2010
- Stultutragus endoluteus Bezark, Santos-Silva & Martins, 2011
- Stultutragus fenestratus (Lucas, 1857)
- Stultutragus linsleyi (Fisher, 1947)
- Stultutragus maytaybaphilus Clarke, 2010
- Stultutragus nigricornis Fisher, 1947
- Stultutragus poecilus (Bates, 1873)
- Stultutragus xantho (Bates, 1873)
