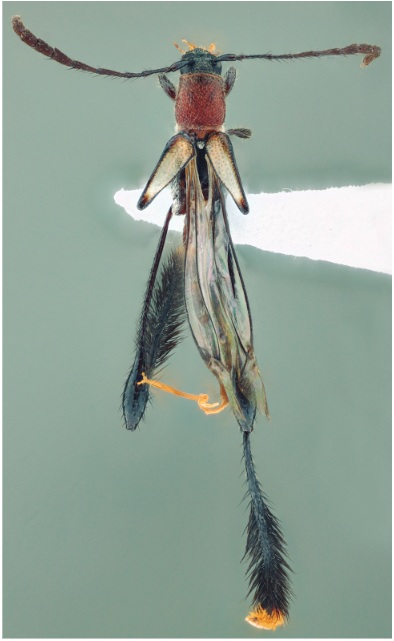

Scientific classification
- Kingdom: Animalia
- Phylum: Arthropoda
- Clade: Pancrustacea
- Class: Insecta
- Order: Coleoptera
- Suborder: Polyphaga
- Infraorder: Cucujiformia
- Family: Cerambycidae
- Genus: Phygopoda
- Species: P. fulvitarsis

Binomial name
- Phygopoda fulvitarsis Gounelle, 1911

= Phygopoda fulvitarsis =

Species of beetle

Phygopoda fulvitarsis is a species of beetle in the family Cerambycidae. It was described by Gounelle in 1911. It is found in French Guiana and Brazil (Amapá, Pará, Amazonas).
