= Stenopseustes gibbicollis =

Scientific classification
- Kingdom: Animalia
- Phylum: Arthropoda
- Class: Insecta
- Order: Coleoptera
- Suborder: Polyphaga
- Infraorder: Cucujiformia
- Family: Cerambycidae
- Genus: Stenopseustes
- Species: S. gibbicollis

Binomial name
- Stenopseustes gibbicollis Fisher, 1947

Species of beetle

Stenopseustes gibbicollis is a species of beetle in the family Cerambycidae. It was described by Fisher in 1947.
