= Ornistomus bicinctus =

Scientific classification
- Kingdom: Animalia
- Phylum: Arthropoda
- Class: Insecta
- Order: Coleoptera
- Suborder: Polyphaga
- Infraorder: Cucujiformia
- Family: Cerambycidae
- Genus: Ornistomus
- Species: O. bicinctus

Binomial name
- Ornistomus bicinctus Thomson, 1864

Species of beetle

Ornistomus bicinctus is a species of beetle in the family Cerambycidae. It was described by Thomson in 1864.
