= Rhopalessa rubroscutellaris =

Scientific classification
- Kingdom: Animalia
- Phylum: Arthropoda
- Class: Insecta
- Order: Coleoptera
- Suborder: Polyphaga
- Infraorder: Cucujiformia
- Family: Cerambycidae
- Genus: Rhopalessa
- Species: R. rubroscutellaris

Binomial name
- Rhopalessa rubroscutellaris (Tippmann, 1960)

Species of beetle

Rhopalessa rubroscutellaris is a species of beetle in the family Cerambycidae. It was described by Tippmann in 1960.
