= Rhopalessa hirticollis =

Scientific classification
- Kingdom: Animalia
- Phylum: Arthropoda
- Class: Insecta
- Order: Coleoptera
- Suborder: Polyphaga
- Infraorder: Cucujiformia
- Family: Cerambycidae
- Genus: Rhopalessa
- Species: R. hirticollis

Binomial name
- Rhopalessa hirticollis (Zajciw, 1958)

Species of beetle

Rhopalessa hirticollis is a species of beetle in the family Cerambycidae. It was described by Zajciw in 1958.
