= Acatinga gallardi =

Scientific classification
- Domain: Eukaryota
- Kingdom: Animalia
- Phylum: Arthropoda
- Class: Insecta
- Order: Coleoptera
- Suborder: Polyphaga
- Infraorder: Cucujiformia
- Family: Cerambycidae
- Genus: Acatinga
- Species: A. gallardi

Binomial name
- Acatinga gallardi (Penaherrera-Leiva & Tavakilian, 2004)

Species of beetle

Acatinga gallardi is a species of beetle in the family Cerambycidae. It was described by Penaherrera-Leiva and Tavakilian in 2004.
