= Ornistomus =

Scientific classification
- Kingdom: Animalia
- Phylum: Arthropoda
- Class: Insecta
- Order: Coleoptera
- Suborder: Polyphaga
- Infraorder: Cucujiformia
- Family: Cerambycidae
- Tribe: Rhinotragini
- Genus: Ornistomus

Genus of beetles

Ornistomus is a genus of beetles in the family Cerambycidae, containing the following species:

- Ornistomus bicinctus Thomson, 1864
- Ornistomus simulatrix Clarke, 2012
