= Ischasioides crassitarsis =

Scientific classification
- Kingdom: Animalia
- Phylum: Arthropoda
- Class: Insecta
- Order: Coleoptera
- Suborder: Polyphaga
- Infraorder: Cucujiformia
- Family: Cerambycidae
- Genus: Ischasioides
- Species: I. crassitarsis

Binomial name
- Ischasioides crassitarsis (Gounelle, 1911)

Species of beetle

Ischasioides crassitarsis is a species of beetle in the family Cerambycidae. It was described by Gounelle in 1911.
