= Neoregostoma discoideum =

Scientific classification
- Domain: Eukaryota
- Kingdom: Animalia
- Phylum: Arthropoda
- Class: Insecta
- Order: Coleoptera
- Suborder: Polyphaga
- Infraorder: Cucujiformia
- Family: Cerambycidae
- Genus: Neoregostoma
- Species: N. discoideum

Binomial name
- Neoregostoma discoideum (Audinet-Serville, 1833)

Species of beetle

Neoregostoma discoideum is a species of beetle in the family Cerambycidae.
