= Phespia gibbosa =

Scientific classification
- Domain: Eukaryota
- Kingdom: Animalia
- Phylum: Arthropoda
- Class: Insecta
- Order: Coleoptera
- Suborder: Polyphaga
- Infraorder: Cucujiformia
- Family: Cerambycidae
- Genus: Phespia
- Species: P. gibbosa

Binomial name
- Phespia gibbosa Magno, 1992

Species of beetle

Phespia gibbosa is a species of beetle in the family Cerambycidae. It was described by Magno in 1992. It occurs in French Guiana and Brazil.
