= Oxylymma championi =

Scientific classification
- Kingdom: Animalia
- Phylum: Arthropoda
- Class: Insecta
- Order: Coleoptera
- Suborder: Polyphaga
- Infraorder: Cucujiformia
- Family: Cerambycidae
- Genus: Oxylymma
- Species: O. championi

Binomial name
- Oxylymma championi Bates, 1885

Species of beetle

Oxylymma championi is a species of beetle in the family Cerambycidae. It was described by Henry Walter Bates in 1885. It occurs in Guatemala.
