= Ecliptophanes =

Scientific classification
- Kingdom: Animalia
- Phylum: Arthropoda
- Class: Insecta
- Order: Coleoptera
- Suborder: Polyphaga
- Infraorder: Cucujiformia
- Family: Cerambycidae
- Subfamily: Cerambycinae
- Tribe: Rhinotragini
- Genus: Ecliptophanes; Melzer, 1935

Genus of beetles

Ecliptophanes is a genus of beetles in the family Cerambycidae, containing the following species:

- Ecliptophanes bucki (Melzer, 1934)
- Ecliptophanes chacunfrancozi (Tavakilian & Penaherrera-Leiva, 2003)
- Ecliptophanes laticornis (Melzer, 1922)
- Ecliptophanes scopipes (Zajciw, 1965)
- Ecliptophanes silvai (Zajciw, 1958)
- Ecliptophanes tommyi (Hovore, 1989)
