= Ecliptophanes bucki =

Scientific classification
- Kingdom: Animalia
- Phylum: Arthropoda
- Class: Insecta
- Order: Coleoptera
- Suborder: Polyphaga
- Infraorder: Cucujiformia
- Family: Cerambycidae
- Genus: Ecliptophanes
- Species: E. bucki

Binomial name
- Ecliptophanes bucki (Melzer, 1934)

Species of beetle

Ecliptophanes bucki is a species of beetle in the family Cerambycidae. It was described by Melzer in 1934.
