= Phygopoda fugax =

Scientific classification
- Domain: Eukaryota
- Kingdom: Animalia
- Phylum: Arthropoda
- Class: Insecta
- Order: Coleoptera
- Suborder: Polyphaga
- Infraorder: Cucujiformia
- Family: Cerambycidae
- Genus: Phygopoda
- Species: P. fugax

Binomial name
- Phygopoda fugax Thomson, 1864

Species of beetle

Phygopoda fugax is a species of beetle in the family Cerambycidae. It was described by Thomson in 1864.
