= Neoregostoma unicolor =

Scientific classification
- Domain: Eukaryota
- Kingdom: Animalia
- Phylum: Arthropoda
- Class: Insecta
- Order: Coleoptera
- Suborder: Polyphaga
- Infraorder: Cucujiformia
- Family: Cerambycidae
- Genus: Neoregostoma
- Species: N. unicolor

Binomial name
- Neoregostoma unicolor (Aurivillius, 1920)

Species of beetle

Neoregostoma unicolor is a species of beetle in the family Cerambycidae.
