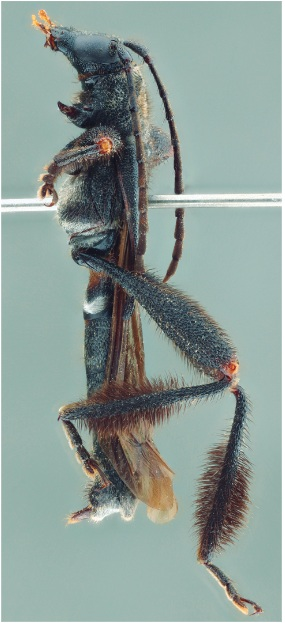

Scientific classification
- Missing taxonomy template (fix): Paramelitta
- Species: Template:Taxonomy/ParamelittaP. aglaia

Binomial name
- Template:Taxonomy/ParamelittaParamelitta aglaia (Newman, 1840)

Synonyms
- Charis aglaia Newman, 1840; Charisia aglaia var. rufo-femorata Gounelle, 1911; Epimelitta aglaia

= Paramelitta aglaia =

Species of beetle

Paramelitta aglaia is a species of beetle in the family Cerambycidae. It was described by Newman in 1840. It is found in Brazil.
