= Sulcommata ruficollis =

Scientific classification
- Kingdom: Animalia
- Phylum: Arthropoda
- Class: Insecta
- Order: Coleoptera
- Suborder: Polyphaga
- Infraorder: Cucujiformia
- Family: Cerambycidae
- Genus: Sulcommata
- Species: S. ruficollis

Binomial name
- Sulcommata ruficollis Tavakilian & Penaherrera-Leiva, 2003

Species of beetle

Sulcommata ruficollis is a species of beetle in the family Cerambycidae. It was described by Tavakilian and Penaherrera-Leiva in 2003.
