= Oxylymma lepida =

Scientific classification
- Domain: Eukaryota
- Kingdom: Animalia
- Phylum: Arthropoda
- Class: Insecta
- Order: Coleoptera
- Suborder: Polyphaga
- Infraorder: Cucujiformia
- Family: Cerambycidae
- Genus: Oxylymma
- Species: O. lepida

Binomial name
- Oxylymma lepida Pascoe, 1859

Species of beetle

Oxylymma lepida is a species of beetle in the family Cerambycidae. It was described by Francis Polkinghorne Pascoe in 1859. It occurs in Brazil (Amazonas, Pará).
