= Cylindrommata lustrata =

Scientific classification
- Kingdom: Animalia
- Phylum: Arthropoda
- Class: Insecta
- Order: Coleoptera
- Suborder: Polyphaga
- Infraorder: Cucujiformia
- Family: Cerambycidae
- Genus: Cylindrommata
- Species: C. lustrata

Binomial name
- Cylindrommata lustrata Monne & Mermudes, 2009

Species of beetle

Cylindrommata lustrata is a species of beetle in the family Cerambycidae. It was described by Monne and Mermudes in 2009.
