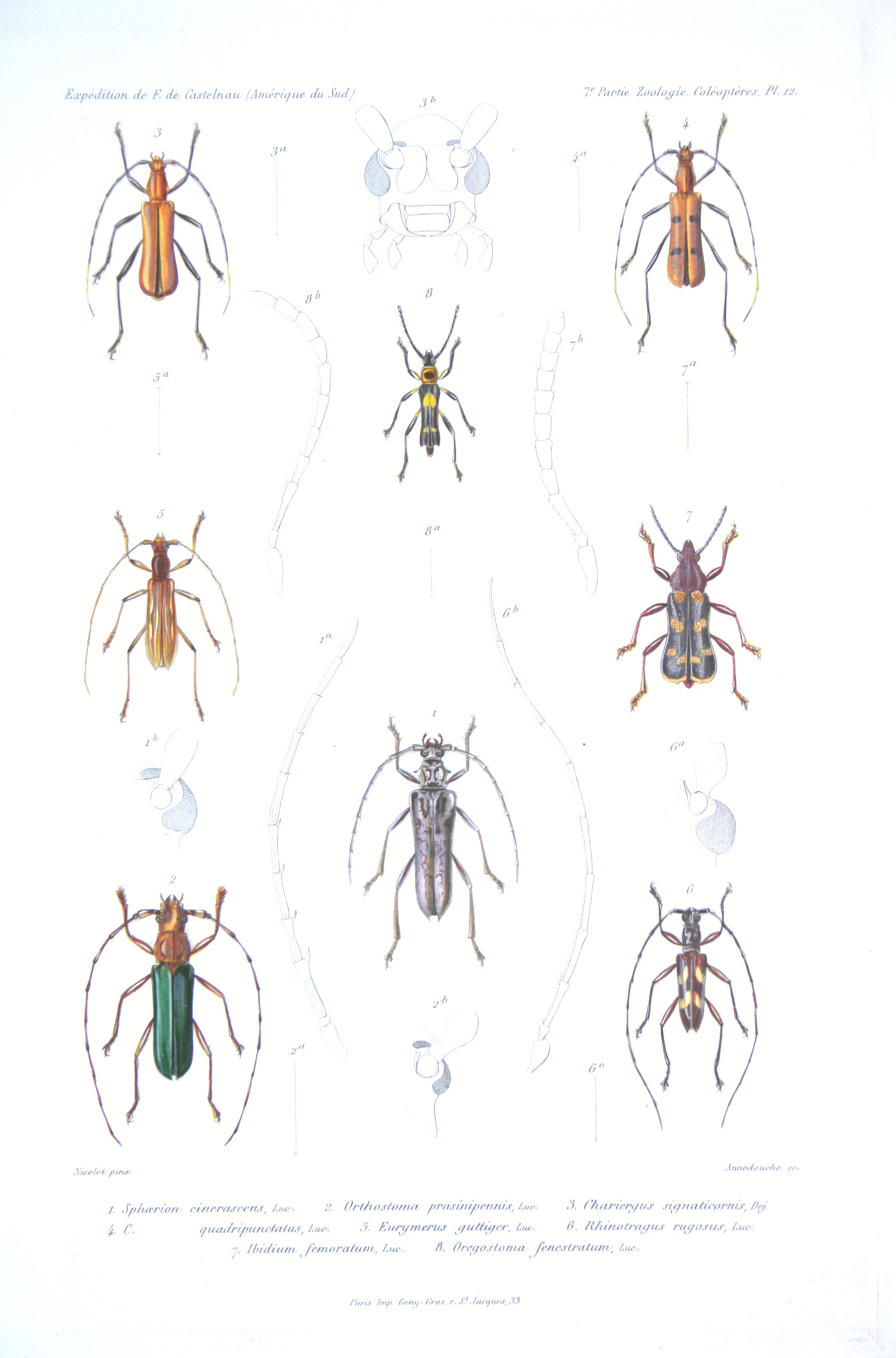
- Rhinotragus rugosus = Erythroplatys rugosus

Scientific classification
- Domain: Eukaryota
- Kingdom: Animalia
- Phylum: Arthropoda
- Class: Insecta
- Order: Coleoptera
- Suborder: Polyphaga
- Infraorder: Cucujiformia
- Family: Cerambycidae
- Genus: Erythroplatys
- Species: E. rugosus

Binomial name
- Erythroplatys rugosus (H. Lucas, 1857)

= Erythroplatys rugosus =

Species of beetle

Erythroplatys rugosus is a species of beetle in the family Cerambycidae. It was described by Hippolyte Lucas in 1857.
