= Crossomeles acutipennis =

Scientific classification
- Domain: Eukaryota
- Kingdom: Animalia
- Phylum: Arthropoda
- Class: Insecta
- Order: Coleoptera
- Suborder: Polyphaga
- Infraorder: Cucujiformia
- Family: Cerambycidae
- Genus: Crossomeles
- Species: C. acutipennis

Binomial name
- Crossomeles acutipennis Chemsak & Noguera, 1993

Species of beetle

Crossomeles acutipennis is a species of beetle in the family Cerambycidae. It was described by Chemsak and Noguera in 1993.
