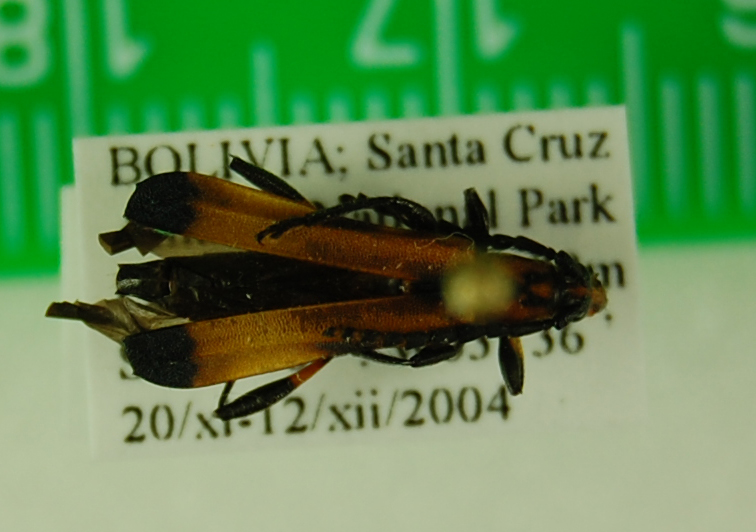

Scientific classification
- Domain: Eukaryota
- Kingdom: Animalia
- Phylum: Arthropoda
- Class: Insecta
- Order: Coleoptera
- Suborder: Polyphaga
- Infraorder: Cucujiformia
- Family: Cerambycidae
- Genus: Aechmutes
- Species: A. armatus

Binomial name
- Aechmutes armatus Gounelle, 1911

= Aechmutes armatus =

Species of beetle

Aechmutes armatus is a species of beetle in the family Cerambycidae. It was described by Gounelle in 1911.
