= Sphecomorpha forficulifera =

Scientific classification
- Kingdom: Animalia
- Phylum: Arthropoda
- Class: Insecta
- Order: Coleoptera
- Suborder: Polyphaga
- Infraorder: Cucujiformia
- Family: Cerambycidae
- Genus: Sphecomorpha
- Species: S. forficulifera

Binomial name
- Sphecomorpha forficulifera (Gounelle, 1913)

Species of beetle

Sphecomorpha forficulifera is a species of beetle in the family Cerambycidae. It was described by Gounelle in 1913.
