= Ecliptophanes laticornis =

Scientific classification
- Kingdom: Animalia
- Phylum: Arthropoda
- Class: Insecta
- Order: Coleoptera
- Suborder: Polyphaga
- Infraorder: Cucujiformia
- Family: Cerambycidae
- Genus: Ecliptophanes
- Species: E. laticornis

Binomial name
- Ecliptophanes laticornis (Melzer, 1922)

Species of beetle

Ecliptophanes laticornis is a species of beetle in the family Cerambycidae. It was described by Melzer in 1922.
