= Pyrpotyra albitarsis =

Scientific classification
- Domain: Eukaryota
- Kingdom: Animalia
- Phylum: Arthropoda
- Class: Insecta
- Order: Coleoptera
- Suborder: Polyphaga
- Infraorder: Cucujiformia
- Family: Cerambycidae
- Genus: Pyrpotyra
- Species: P. albitarsis

Binomial name
- Pyrpotyra albitarsis (Galileo & Martins, 2010)

Species of beetle

Pyrpotyra albitarsis is a species of beetle in the family Cerambycidae. It was described by Galileo and Martins in 2010.
