= Neoregostoma coccineum =

Scientific classification
- Kingdom: Animalia
- Phylum: Arthropoda
- Clade: Pancrustacea
- Class: Insecta
- Order: Coleoptera
- Suborder: Polyphaga
- Infraorder: Cucujiformia
- Family: Cerambycidae
- Genus: Neoregostoma
- Species: N. coccineum

Binomial name
- Neoregostoma coccineum (Gory in Guérin-Méneville, 1831)

Species of beetle

Neoregostoma coccineum is a species of beetle in the family Cerambycidae.
