= Phespia corinna =

Scientific classification
- Domain: Eukaryota
- Kingdom: Animalia
- Phylum: Arthropoda
- Class: Insecta
- Order: Coleoptera
- Suborder: Polyphaga
- Infraorder: Cucujiformia
- Family: Cerambycidae
- Genus: Phespia
- Species: P. corinna

Binomial name
- Phespia corinna (Pascoe, 1866)

Synonyms
- Charis corinna Pascoe, 1866

Species of beetle

Phespia corinna is a species of beetle in the family Cerambycidae. It was described by Francis Polkinghorne Pascoe in 1866. It occurs in Guatemala, Nicaragua, Costa Rica, Panama, and Colombia.
