= Parischasia chamenoisi =

Scientific classification
- Kingdom: Animalia
- Phylum: Arthropoda
- Class: Insecta
- Order: Coleoptera
- Suborder: Polyphaga
- Infraorder: Cucujiformia
- Family: Cerambycidae
- Genus: Parischasia
- Species: P. chamenoisi

Binomial name
- Parischasia chamenoisi Tavakilian & Peñaherrera-Leiva, 2005

Species of beetle

Parischasia chamenoisi is a species of beetle in the family Cerambycidae. It was described by Tavakilian and Peñaherrera-Leiva in 2005.
