= Chrysommata =

Scientific classification
- Domain: Eukaryota
- Kingdom: Animalia
- Phylum: Arthropoda
- Class: Insecta
- Order: Coleoptera
- Suborder: Polyphaga
- Infraorder: Cucujiformia
- Family: Cerambycidae
- Subfamily: Cerambycinae
- Tribe: Rhinotragini
- Genus: Chrysommata; Penaherrera-Leiva & Tavakilian, 2003

Genus of beetles

Chrysommata is a genus of beetles in the family Cerambycidae, containing the following species:

- Chrysommata keithi (Tavakilian & Penaherrera-Leiva, 2003)
- Chrysommata lauracea (Penaherrera-Leiva & Tavakilian, 2003)
