= Aechmutes subandinus =

Scientific classification
- Domain: Eukaryota
- Kingdom: Animalia
- Phylum: Arthropoda
- Class: Insecta
- Order: Coleoptera
- Suborder: Polyphaga
- Infraorder: Cucujiformia
- Family: Cerambycidae
- Genus: Aechmutes
- Species: A. subandinus

Binomial name
- Aechmutes subandinus Clarke, 2012

Species of beetle

Aechmutes subandinus is a species of beetle in the family Cerambycidae. It was described by Clarke in 2012.
