= Phygopoda ingae =

Scientific classification
- Domain: Eukaryota
- Kingdom: Animalia
- Phylum: Arthropoda
- Class: Insecta
- Order: Coleoptera
- Suborder: Polyphaga
- Infraorder: Cucujiformia
- Family: Cerambycidae
- Genus: Phygopoda
- Species: P. ingae

Binomial name
- Phygopoda ingae Penaherrera-Leiva & Tavakilian, 2004

Species of beetle

Phygopoda ingae is a species of beetle in the family Cerambycidae. It was described by Penaherrera-Leiva and Tavakilian in 2004.
