= Rhopalessa =

Scientific classification
- Kingdom: Animalia
- Phylum: Arthropoda
- Class: Insecta
- Order: Coleoptera
- Suborder: Polyphaga
- Infraorder: Cucujiformia
- Family: Cerambycidae
- Subfamily: Cerambycinae
- Tribe: Rhinotragini
- Genus: Rhopalessa; Bates, 1873

Genus of beetles

Rhopalessa is a genus of beetles in the family Cerambycidae, containing the following species:

- Rhopalessa clavicornis (Bates, 1873)
- Rhopalessa demissa (Melzer, 1934)
- Rhopalessa durantoni (Penaherrera-Leiva & Tavakilian, 2004)
- Rhopalessa hirticollis (Zajciw, 1958)
- Rhopalessa moraguesi (Tavakilian & Penaherrera-Leiva, 2003)
- Rhopalessa pilosicollis (Zajciw, 1966)
- Rhopalessa rubroscutellaris (Tippmann, 1960)
- Rhopalessa subandina Clarke, Martins & Santos-Silva, 2011
