= Oregostoma =

Scientific classification
- Kingdom: Animalia
- Phylum: Arthropoda
- Class: Insecta
- Order: Coleoptera
- Suborder: Polyphaga
- Infraorder: Cucujiformia
- Family: Cerambycidae
- Subfamily: Cerambycinae
- Tribe: Rhinotragini
- Genus: Oregostoma; Audinet-Serville, 1833

Genus of beetles

Oregostoma is a genus of beetles in the family Cerambycidae, containing the following species:

- Oregostoma bipartitum (Bates, 1873)
- Oregostoma nigripes Audinet-Serville, 1833
- Oregostoma nitidiventre (Gounelle, 1911)
- Oregostoma puniceum (Newman, 1838)
