= Laedorcari pubipennis =

Scientific classification
- Kingdom: Animalia
- Phylum: Arthropoda
- Class: Insecta
- Order: Coleoptera
- Suborder: Polyphaga
- Infraorder: Cucujiformia
- Family: Cerambycidae
- Genus: Laedorcari
- Species: L. pubipennis

Binomial name
- Laedorcari pubipennis (Fisher, 1952)

Species of beetle

Laedorcari pubipennis is a species of beetle in the family Cerambycidae.
