= Pseudagaone =

Scientific classification
- Kingdom: Animalia
- Phylum: Arthropoda
- Class: Insecta
- Order: Coleoptera
- Suborder: Polyphaga
- Infraorder: Cucujiformia
- Family: Cerambycidae
- Tribe: Rhinotragini
- Genus: Pseudagaone; Tippmann, 1960

Genus of beetles

Pseudagaone is a genus of beetles in the family Cerambycidae, containing the following species:

- Pseudagaone cerdai Tavakilian & Penaherrera-Leiva, 2007
- Pseudagaone suturafissa Tippmann, 1960
