= Xenocrasis badeni =

Scientific classification
- Kingdom: Animalia
- Phylum: Arthropoda
- Class: Insecta
- Order: Coleoptera
- Suborder: Polyphaga
- Infraorder: Cucujiformia
- Family: Cerambycidae
- Genus: Xenocrasis
- Species: X. badeni

Binomial name
- Xenocrasis badeni Bates, 1873

Species of beetle

Xenocrasis badeni is a species of beetle in the family Cerambycidae. It was described by Henry Walter Bates in 1873.
