= Phygopoda exilis =

Scientific classification
- Kingdom: Animalia
- Phylum: Arthropoda
- Class: Insecta
- Order: Coleoptera
- Suborder: Polyphaga
- Infraorder: Cucujiformia
- Family: Cerambycidae
- Genus: Phygopoda
- Species: P. exilis

Binomial name
- Phygopoda exilis (Melzer, 1933)

Synonyms
- Neophygopoda exilis Melzer, 1933

Species of beetle

Phygopoda exilis is a species of beetle in the family Cerambycidae.
