= Pseudagaone suturafissa =

Scientific classification
- Kingdom: Animalia
- Phylum: Arthropoda
- Class: Insecta
- Order: Coleoptera
- Suborder: Polyphaga
- Infraorder: Cucujiformia
- Family: Cerambycidae
- Genus: Pseudagaone
- Species: P. suturafissa

Binomial name
- Pseudagaone suturafissa Tippmann, 1960

Species of beetle

Pseudagaone suturafissa is a species of beetle in the family Cerambycidae. It was described by Tippmann in 1960.
