= Carenoptomerus =

Carenoptomerus guyanensis

Scientific classification
- Kingdom: Animalia
- Phylum: Arthropoda
- Class: Insecta
- Order: Coleoptera
- Suborder: Polyphaga
- Infraorder: Cucujiformia
- Family: Cerambycidae
- Genus: Carenoptomerus
- Species: C. guyanensis

Binomial name
- Carenoptomerus guyanensis Tavakilian & Penaherrera-Leiva, 2003

Genus of beetles

Carenoptomerus guyanensis is a species of beetle in the family Cerambycidae, the only species in the genus Carenoptomerus.
