= Pseudacorethra =

Pseudacorethra zischkai

Scientific classification
- Kingdom: Animalia
- Phylum: Arthropoda
- Class: Insecta
- Order: Coleoptera
- Suborder: Polyphaga
- Infraorder: Cucujiformia
- Family: Cerambycidae
- Genus: Pseudacorethra
- Species: P. zischkai

Binomial name
- Pseudacorethra zischkai (Tippmann, 1960)

Genus of beetles

Pseudacorethra zischkai is a species of beetle in the family Cerambycidae, the only species in the genus Pseudacorethra.

It was described by Friedrich F. Tippmann in 1960.
