= Laedorcari =

Scientific classification
- Kingdom: Animalia
- Phylum: Arthropoda
- Class: Insecta
- Order: Coleoptera
- Suborder: Polyphaga
- Infraorder: Cucujiformia
- Family: Cerambycidae
- Tribe: Trachyderini
- Genus: Laedorcari

Genus of beetles

Laedorcari is a genus of beetles in the family Cerambycidae, containing the following species:

- Laedorcari fulvicollis (Lacordaire, 1869)
- Laedorcari pubipennis (Fisher, 1952)
- Laedorcari vestitipennis (Zajciw, 1963)
