= Catorthontus =

Catorthontus collaris

Scientific classification
- Kingdom: Animalia
- Phylum: Arthropoda
- Class: Insecta
- Order: Coleoptera
- Suborder: Polyphaga
- Infraorder: Cucujiformia
- Family: Cerambycidae
- Genus: Catorthontus
- Species: C. collaris

Binomial name
- Catorthontus collaris Waterhouse, 1880

Genus of beetles

Catorthontus collaris is a species of beetle in the family Cerambycidae, the only species in the genus Catorthontus.
