= Monneus =

Monneus longiventris

Scientific classification
- Kingdom: Animalia
- Phylum: Arthropoda
- Class: Insecta
- Order: Coleoptera
- Suborder: Polyphaga
- Infraorder: Cucujiformia
- Family: Cerambycidae
- Genus: Monneus
- Species: M. longiventris

Binomial name
- Monneus longiventris Magno, 2001

Genus of beetles

Monneus longiventris is a species of beetle in the family Cerambycidae, the only species in the genus Monneus.
