= Pseudisthmiade =

Pseudisthmiade larrei

Scientific classification
- Kingdom: Animalia
- Phylum: Arthropoda
- Class: Insecta
- Order: Coleoptera
- Suborder: Polyphaga
- Infraorder: Cucujiformia
- Family: Cerambycidae
- Genus: Pseudisthmiade
- Species: P. larrei

Binomial name
- Pseudisthmiade larrei Tavakilian & Peñaherrera-Leiva, 2005

Species of beetles

Pseudisthmiade larrei is a species of beetle in the family Cerambycidae, the only species in the genus Pseudisthmiade.
