= Ischasioides =

Scientific classification
- Kingdom: Animalia
- Phylum: Arthropoda
- Class: Insecta
- Order: Coleoptera
- Suborder: Polyphaga
- Infraorder: Cucujiformia
- Family: Cerambycidae
- Tribe: Trachyderini
- Genus: Ischasioides

Genus of beetles

Ischasioides is a genus of beetles in the family Cerambycidae, containing the following species:

- Ischasioides crassitarsis (Gounelle, 1911)
- Ischasioides gounellei Tavakilian & Penaherrera-Leiva, 2003
