= Oxyommata =

Oxyommata collaris

Scientific classification
- Kingdom: Animalia
- Phylum: Arthropoda
- Class: Insecta
- Order: Coleoptera
- Suborder: Polyphaga
- Infraorder: Cucujiformia
- Family: Cerambycidae
- Genus: Oxyommata
- Species: O. collaris

Binomial name
- Oxyommata collaris (Audinet-Serville, 1833)

Genus of beetles

Oxyommata collaris is a species of beetle in the family Cerambycidae, the only species in the genus Oxyommata.
