= Apostropha =

Apostropha curvipennis

Scientific classification
- Kingdom: Animalia
- Phylum: Arthropoda
- Class: Insecta
- Order: Coleoptera
- Suborder: Polyphaga
- Infraorder: Cucujiformia
- Family: Cerambycidae
- Genus: Apostropha
- Species: A. curvipennis

Binomial name
- Apostropha curvipennis Bates, 1873

Genus of beetles

Apostropha curvipennis is a species of beetle in the family Cerambycidae, the only species in the genus Apostropha.
