= Neoregostoma =

- Neoregostoma coccineum

Scientific classification
- Kingdom: Animalia
- Phylum: Arthropoda
- Clade: Pancrustacea
- Class: Insecta
- Order: Coleoptera
- Suborder: Polyphaga
- Infraorder: Cucujiformia
- Family: Cerambycidae
- Genus: Neoregostoma; Monné & Giesbert, 1992

Genus of beetles

Neoregostoma is a genus of beetles in the family Cerambycidae.

== Species ==
The following species are recognised in the genus Neoregostoma:

- Neoregostoma bettelai Clarke, 2010
- Neoregostoma coccineum (Gory in Guérin-Méneville, 1831)
- Neoregostoma discoideum (Audinet-Serville, 1833)
- Neoregostoma erythrocallum (Lane, 1940)
- Neoregostoma fasciatum (Aurivillius, 1920)
- Neoregostoma giesberti Clarke, 2007
- Neoregostoma luridum (Klug, 1825)
- Neoregostoma salazari Esteban Duran & Santos-Silva, 2015
- Neoregostoma spinipenne (Fuchs, 1961)
- Neoregostoma unicolor (Aurivillius, 1920)
