= Antennommata =

Antennommata costata

Scientific classification
- Kingdom: Animalia
- Phylum: Arthropoda
- Class: Insecta
- Order: Coleoptera
- Suborder: Polyphaga
- Infraorder: Cucujiformia
- Family: Cerambycidae
- Genus: Antennommata
- Species: A. costata

Binomial name
- Antennommata costata Clarke, 2010

Genus of beetles

Antennommata costata is a species of beetle in the family Cerambycidae, the only species in the genus Antennommata.
