= Xenocrasoides =

Xenocrasoides soukai

Scientific classification
- Kingdom: Animalia
- Phylum: Arthropoda
- Class: Insecta
- Order: Coleoptera
- Suborder: Polyphaga
- Infraorder: Cucujiformia
- Family: Cerambycidae
- Genus: Xenocrasoides
- Species: X. soukai

Binomial name
- Xenocrasoides soukai Tavakilian & Penaherrera-Leiva, 2003

Genus of beetles

Xenocrasoides soukai is a species of beetle in the family Cerambycidae, the only species in the genus Xenocrasoides.
