= Pasiphyle =

Pasiphyle mystica

Scientific classification
- Kingdom: Animalia
- Phylum: Arthropoda
- Class: Insecta
- Order: Coleoptera
- Suborder: Polyphaga
- Infraorder: Cucujiformia
- Family: Cerambycidae
- Genus: Pasiphyle
- Species: P. mystica

Binomial name
- Pasiphyle mystica Thomson, 1864

Genus of beetles

Pasiphyle mystica is a species of beetle in the family Cerambycidae, the only species in the genus Pasiphyle.
