= Palladin (surname) =

Palladin (Russian: Палладин, Ukrainian: Палладін) is a Slavic masculine surname originating from the Greek Pallas, its feminine counterpart is Palladina. It may refer to:

- Aleksandr Palladin (1885 – 1972), Ukrainian biochemist
- Jean-Louis Palladin (1946 - 2001), French chef
- Vladimir Palladin (1859 – 1922), Russian biochemist and botanist, father of Aleksandr
