= Athetesis angulicollis =

Scientific classification
- Domain: Eukaryota
- Kingdom: Animalia
- Phylum: Arthropoda
- Class: Insecta
- Order: Coleoptera
- Suborder: Polyphaga
- Infraorder: Cucujiformia
- Family: Cerambycidae
- Genus: Athetesis
- Species: A. angulicollis

Binomial name
- Athetesis angulicollis (Zajciw, 1961)

Species of beetle

Athetesis angulicollis is a species of beetle in the family Cerambycidae. It was described by Zajciw in 1961.
