= Potiaxixa gounellei =

Scientific classification
- Domain: Eukaryota
- Kingdom: Animalia
- Phylum: Arthropoda
- Class: Insecta
- Order: Coleoptera
- Suborder: Polyphaga
- Infraorder: Cucujiformia
- Family: Cerambycidae
- Subfamily: Cerambycinae
- Tribe: Cerambycini
- Genus: Potiaxixa
- Species: P. gounellei

Binomial name
- Potiaxixa gounellei (Zajciw, 1966)

Synonyms
- Brasilianus gounellei Zajciw, 1966; Hammatochaerus consobrinus Gounelle, 1909

Species of beetle

Potiaxixa gounellei is a species in the longhorn beetle family Cerambycidae. It is found in Brazil, French Guiana, and Suriname.

This species was described by Dmytro Zajciw in 1966.
