= Chlorotherion consimilis =

Scientific classification
- Domain: Eukaryota
- Kingdom: Animalia
- Phylum: Arthropoda
- Class: Insecta
- Order: Coleoptera
- Suborder: Polyphaga
- Infraorder: Cucujiformia
- Family: Cerambycidae
- Genus: Chlorotherion
- Species: C. consimilis

Binomial name
- Chlorotherion consimilis Zajciw, 1962

Species of beetle

Chlorotherion consimilis is a species of beetle in the family Cerambycidae. It was described by Dmytro Zajciw in 1962. It is endemic to Brazil and known from São Paulo, Espírito Santo, and Mato Grosso.
