= Urangaua subanalis =

Scientific classification
- Kingdom: Animalia
- Phylum: Arthropoda
- Class: Insecta
- Order: Coleoptera
- Suborder: Polyphaga
- Infraorder: Cucujiformia
- Family: Cerambycidae
- Genus: Urangaua
- Species: U. subanalis

Binomial name
- Urangaua subanalis (Zajciw, 1964)

Species of beetle

Urangaua subanalis is a species of beetle in the family Cerambycidae. It was described by Zajciw in 1964.
