= Stizocera diversispinis =

Scientific classification
- Kingdom: Animalia
- Phylum: Arthropoda
- Class: Insecta
- Order: Coleoptera
- Suborder: Polyphaga
- Infraorder: Cucujiformia
- Family: Cerambycidae
- Genus: Stizocera
- Species: S. diversispinis

Binomial name
- Stizocera diversispinis Zajciw, 1962

Species of beetle

Stizocera diversispinis is a species of beetle in the family Cerambycidae. It was described by Zajciw in 1962.
