= Ischasia picticornis =

Scientific classification
- Kingdom: Animalia
- Phylum: Arthropoda
- Class: Insecta
- Order: Coleoptera
- Suborder: Polyphaga
- Infraorder: Cucujiformia
- Family: Cerambycidae
- Genus: Ischasia
- Species: I. picticornis

Binomial name
- Ischasia picticornis Zajciw, 1973

Species of beetle

Ischasia picticornis is a species of beetle in the family Cerambycidae. It was described by Zajciw in 1973.
