= Stizocera nigroflava =

Scientific classification
- Kingdom: Animalia
- Phylum: Arthropoda
- Class: Insecta
- Order: Coleoptera
- Suborder: Polyphaga
- Infraorder: Cucujiformia
- Family: Cerambycidae
- Genus: Stizocera
- Species: S. nigroflava

Binomial name
- Stizocera nigroflava Zajciw, 1965

Species of beetle

Stizocera nigroflava is a species of beetle in the family Cerambycidae. It was described by Zajciw in 1965.
