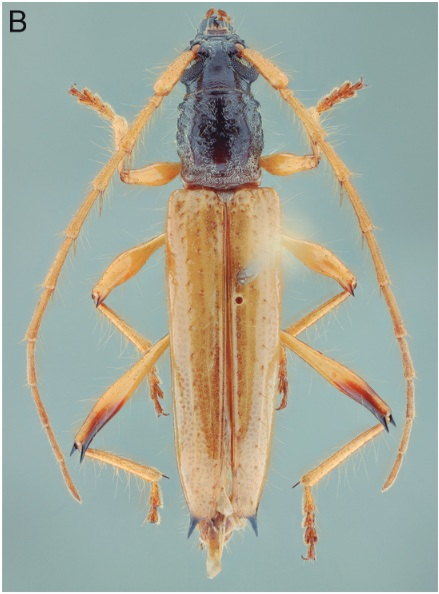

Scientific classification
- Kingdom: Animalia
- Phylum: Arthropoda
- Clade: Pancrustacea
- Class: Insecta
- Order: Coleoptera
- Suborder: Polyphaga
- Infraorder: Cucujiformia
- Family: Cerambycidae
- Genus: Stizocera
- Species: S. sublaevigata

Binomial name
- Stizocera sublaevigata Zajciw, 1962

= Stizocera sublaevigata =

Species of beetle

Stizocera sublaevigata is a species of beetle in the family Cerambycidae. It was described by Zajciw in 1962. It is found in Bolivia and Brazil.
