= Tomopterus rufotibialis =

Scientific classification
- Kingdom: Animalia
- Phylum: Arthropoda
- Class: Insecta
- Order: Coleoptera
- Suborder: Polyphaga
- Infraorder: Cucujiformia
- Family: Cerambycidae
- Genus: Tomopterus
- Species: T. rufotibialis

Binomial name
- Tomopterus rufotibialis (Zajciw, 1968)

Species of beetle

Tomopterus rufotibialis is a species of beetle in the family of Cerambycidae. It was described by Zajciw in 1968.
