= Moema =

Moema may refer to:

- Moema (Victor Meirelles), 1866 painting
- Moema, Minas Gerais, a municipality in Brazil
- Moema (district of São Paulo), a district in Brazil
  - Moema (São Paulo Metro), a metro station
- Moema Gramacho, Brazilian politician, affiliated with the Workers' Party (PT).
- Moema (fish), a genus of killifish
- Beraba moema, a beetle of family Cerambycidae
- Recchia moema, a beetle of family Cerambycidae
- Sem Moema, British politician
