= Isthmiade cylindrica =

Scientific classification
- Domain: Eukaryota
- Kingdom: Animalia
- Phylum: Arthropoda
- Class: Insecta
- Order: Coleoptera
- Suborder: Polyphaga
- Infraorder: Cucujiformia
- Family: Cerambycidae
- Genus: Isthmiade
- Species: I. cylindrica

Binomial name
- Isthmiade cylindrica Zajciw, 1972

Species of beetle

Isthmiade cylindrica is a species of beetle in the family Cerambycidae. It was described by Ukrainian-Brazilian entomologist Dmytro Zajciw in 1972.
