= Tomopterus longicornis =

Scientific classification
- Kingdom: Animalia
- Phylum: Arthropoda
- Class: Insecta
- Order: Coleoptera
- Suborder: Polyphaga
- Infraorder: Cucujiformia
- Family: Cerambycidae
- Genus: Tomopterus
- Species: T. longicornis

Binomial name
- Tomopterus longicornis Zajciw, 1969

Species of beetle

Tomopterus longicornis is a species of beetle in the family Cerambycidae. It was described by Zajciw in 1969.
