= Tomopterus aurantiacosignatus =

Scientific classification
- Kingdom: Animalia
- Phylum: Arthropoda
- Class: Insecta
- Order: Coleoptera
- Suborder: Polyphaga
- Infraorder: Cucujiformia
- Family: Cerambycidae
- Genus: Tomopterus
- Species: T. aurantiacosignatus

Binomial name
- Tomopterus aurantiacosignatus Zajciw, 1969

Species of beetle

Tomopterus aurantiacosignatus is a species of beetle in the family Cerambycidae. It was described by Dmytro Zajciw in 1969.
