= Plistonax bialbomaculatus =

Scientific classification
- Domain: Eukaryota
- Kingdom: Animalia
- Phylum: Arthropoda
- Class: Insecta
- Order: Coleoptera
- Suborder: Polyphaga
- Infraorder: Cucujiformia
- Family: Cerambycidae
- Genus: Plistonax
- Species: P. bialbomaculatus

Binomial name
- Plistonax bialbomaculatus (Zajciw, 1964)

Synonyms
- Psapharochrus bialbomaculatus Zajciw, 1964

Species of beetle

Plistonax bialbomaculatus is a species of beetle in the family Cerambycidae. It was described by Zajciw in 1964.
