= Tomopterus albopilosus =

Scientific classification
- Kingdom: Animalia
- Phylum: Arthropoda
- Class: Insecta
- Order: Coleoptera
- Suborder: Polyphaga
- Infraorder: Cucujiformia
- Family: Cerambycidae
- Genus: Tomopterus
- Species: T. albopilosus

Binomial name
- Tomopterus albopilosus Zajciw, 1964

Species of beetle

Tomopterus albopilosus is a species of beetle in the family Cerambycidae. It was described by Zajciw in 1964.
