= Beraba spinosa =

Scientific classification
- Kingdom: Animalia
- Phylum: Arthropoda
- Class: Insecta
- Order: Coleoptera
- Suborder: Polyphaga
- Infraorder: Cucujiformia
- Family: Cerambycidae
- Genus: Beraba
- Species: B. spinosa

Binomial name
- Beraba spinosa Zajciw, 1967

Species of beetle

Beraba spinosa is a species of beetle in the family Cerambycidae. It was described by Zajciw in 1967.
