= Beraba decora =

Scientific classification
- Kingdom: Animalia
- Phylum: Arthropoda
- Class: Insecta
- Order: Coleoptera
- Suborder: Polyphaga
- Infraorder: Cucujiformia
- Family: Cerambycidae
- Genus: Beraba
- Species: B. decora

Binomial name
- Beraba decora (Zajciw, 1961)

Synonyms
- Eburia decora (Zajciw, 1961)

Species of beetle

Beraba decora is a species of beetle in the family Cerambycidae. It was described by Zajciw in 1961.
