= Pseudoeriphus sanguinicollis =

Scientific classification
- Domain: Eukaryota
- Kingdom: Animalia
- Phylum: Arthropoda
- Class: Insecta
- Order: Coleoptera
- Suborder: Polyphaga
- Infraorder: Cucujiformia
- Family: Cerambycidae
- Genus: Pseudoeriphus
- Species: P. sanguinicollis

Binomial name
- Pseudoeriphus sanguinicollis Zajciw, 1961

Species of beetle

Pseudoeriphus sanguinicollis is a species of beetle in the family Cerambycidae. It was described by Zajciw in 1961.
