= Adesmoides =

Scientific classification
- Domain: Eukaryota
- Kingdom: Animalia
- Phylum: Arthropoda
- Class: Insecta
- Order: Coleoptera
- Suborder: Polyphaga
- Infraorder: Cucujiformia
- Family: Cerambycidae
- Tribe: Hemilophini
- Genus: Adesmoides
- Species: A. flava

Binomial name
- Adesmoides flava Zajciw, 1967

Genus of beetles

Adesmoides flava is a species of beetle in the family Cerambycidae, and the only species in the genus Adesmoides. It was described by Zajciw in 1967.
