= Beraba erosa =

Scientific classification
- Kingdom: Animalia
- Phylum: Arthropoda
- Class: Insecta
- Order: Coleoptera
- Suborder: Polyphaga
- Infraorder: Cucujiformia
- Family: Cerambycidae
- Genus: Beraba
- Species: B. erosa

Binomial name
- Beraba erosa (Martins, 1981)

Species of beetle

Beraba erosa is a species of beetle in the family Cerambycidae. It was described by Martins in 1981.
