= Ischasia nevermanni =

Scientific classification
- Kingdom: Animalia
- Phylum: Arthropoda
- Class: Insecta
- Order: Coleoptera
- Suborder: Polyphaga
- Infraorder: Cucujiformia
- Family: Cerambycidae
- Genus: Ischasia
- Species: I. nevermanni

Binomial name
- Ischasia nevermanni Fisher, 1947

Species of beetle

Ischasia nevermanni is a species of beetle in the family Cerambycidae. It was described by Fisher in 1947.
