= Beraba cheilaria =

Scientific classification
- Kingdom: Animalia
- Phylum: Arthropoda
- Class: Insecta
- Order: Coleoptera
- Suborder: Polyphaga
- Infraorder: Cucujiformia
- Family: Cerambycidae
- Genus: Beraba
- Species: B. cheilaria

Binomial name
- Beraba cheilaria (Martins, 1967)

Species of beetle

Beraba cheilaria is a species of beetle in the family Cerambycidae. It was described by Martins in 1967.
