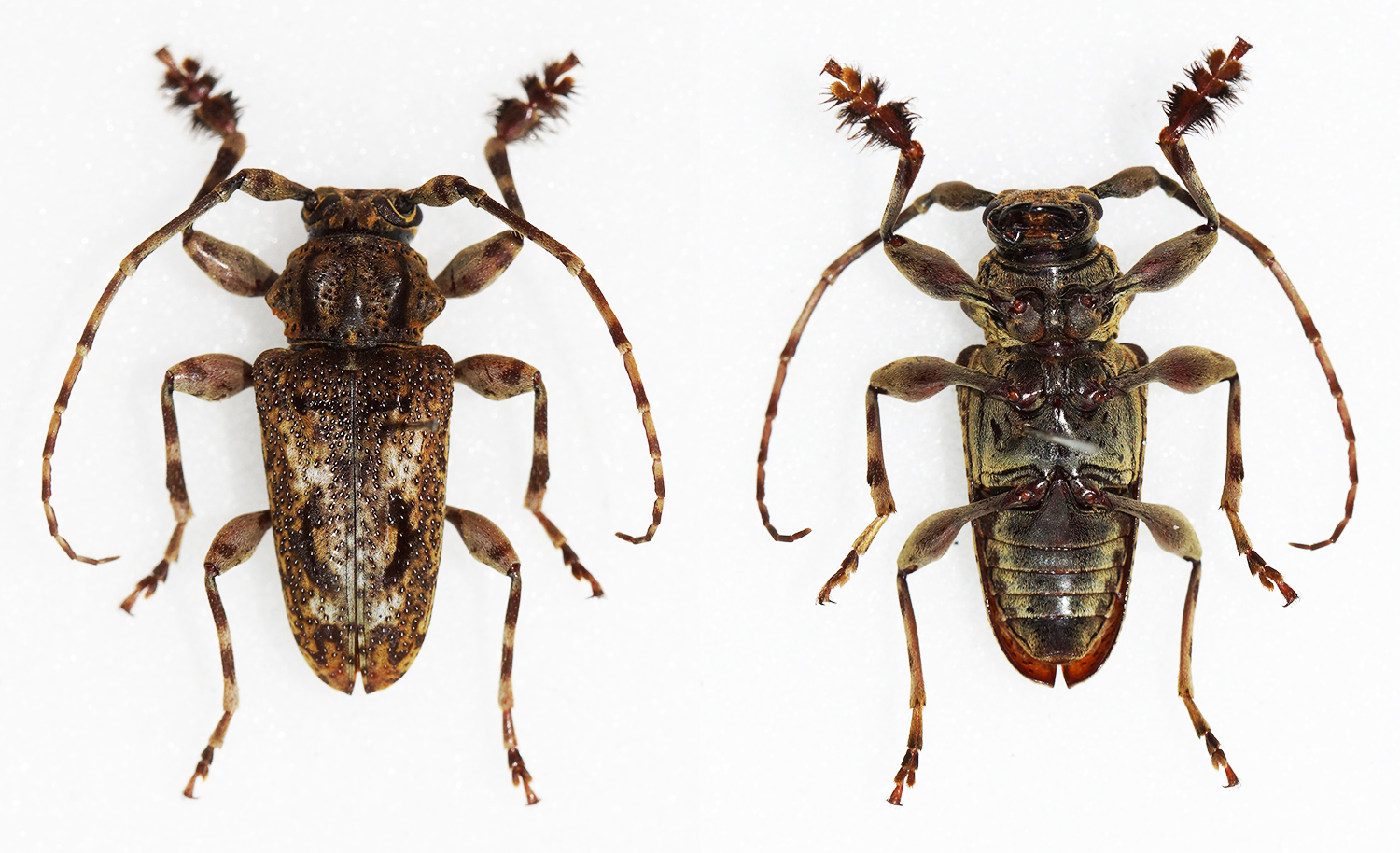
- Plistonax albolinitus

Scientific classification
- Kingdom: Animalia
- Phylum: Arthropoda
- Clade: Pancrustacea
- Class: Insecta
- Order: Coleoptera
- Suborder: Polyphaga
- Infraorder: Cucujiformia
- Family: Cerambycidae
- Subfamily: Lamiinae
- Tribe: Acanthoderini
- Genus: Plistonax; Thomson, 1864

= Plistonax =

Genus of beetles

Plistonax is a genus of beetles in the family Cerambycidae. Plistonax is a Neotropical genus of flat-faced long-horned beetles (tribe Acanthoderini). Originally, scientists described Plistonax with nine species but lacked clear diagnostic traits, leading to unstable classification. Plistonax is polyphyletic, where Plistonax insolitus emerged as a lone lineage.

== Species ==
Plistonax contains the following species:

- Plistonax albituberculatus Silva Junior & Souza, 2019
- Plistonax albolinitus (Bates, 1861)
- Plistonax antonkozlovi Santos-Silva, Nascimento & Silva Junior, 2020
- Plistonax ariasi (Chemsak & Hovore, 2002)
- Plistonax bialbomaculatus (Zajciw, 1964)
- Plistonax difficilis (Chemsak & Hovore, 2002)
- Plistonax hefferni (Audureau, 2017)
- Plistonax inopinatus Lane, 1960
- Plistonax pictus (Galileo & Martins, 2012)
- Plistonax rafaeli Martins & Galileo, 2006
- Plistonax senecauxi Tavakilian & Neouze, 2013
- Plistonax signatifrons (Zajciw, 1964)
