= Seabraia =

Scientific classification
- Kingdom: Animalia
- Phylum: Arthropoda
- Class: Insecta
- Order: Coleoptera
- Suborder: Polyphaga
- Infraorder: Cucujiformia
- Family: Cerambycidae
- Subfamily: Cerambycinae
- Tribe: Trachyderini
- Genus: Seabraia; Zajciw, 1958

Genus of beetles

Seabraia is a genus of beetles in the family Cerambycidae, containing the following species:

- Seabraia sanguinicollis Zajciw, 1958
- Seabraia zajciwi Lane, 1965
