= Stizocera punctatissima =

Scientific classification
- Kingdom: Animalia
- Phylum: Arthropoda
- Class: Insecta
- Order: Coleoptera
- Suborder: Polyphaga
- Infraorder: Cucujiformia
- Family: Cerambycidae
- Genus: Stizocera
- Species: S. punctatissima

Binomial name
- Stizocera punctatissima Martins, 2005

Species of beetle

Stizocera punctatissima is a species of beetle in the family Cerambycidae. It was described by Martins in 2005.
