= Tomopterus consobrinus =

Scientific classification
- Kingdom: Animalia
- Phylum: Arthropoda
- Class: Insecta
- Order: Coleoptera
- Suborder: Polyphaga
- Infraorder: Cucujiformia
- Family: Cerambycidae
- Genus: Tomopterus
- Species: T. consobrinus

Binomial name
- Tomopterus consobrinus Gounelle, 1911

Species of beetle

Tomopterus consobrinus is a species of beetle in the family Cerambycidae. It was described by Gounelle in 1911.
