= Stizocera submetallica =

Scientific classification
- Kingdom: Animalia
- Phylum: Arthropoda
- Class: Insecta
- Order: Coleoptera
- Suborder: Polyphaga
- Infraorder: Cucujiformia
- Family: Cerambycidae
- Genus: Stizocera
- Species: S. submetallica

Binomial name
- Stizocera submetallica (Chemsak & Linsley, 1968)

Species of beetle

Stizocera submetallica is a species of beetle in the family Cerambycidae. It was described by Chemsak and Linsley in 1968.
