= Callancyla tucumana =

Scientific classification
- Domain: Eukaryota
- Kingdom: Animalia
- Phylum: Arthropoda
- Class: Insecta
- Order: Coleoptera
- Suborder: Polyphaga
- Infraorder: Cucujiformia
- Family: Cerambycidae
- Genus: Callancyla
- Species: C. tucumana

Binomial name
- Callancyla tucumana Viana, 1971

Species of beetle

Callancyla tucumana is a species of beetle in the family Cerambycidae. It was described by Viana in 1971.
