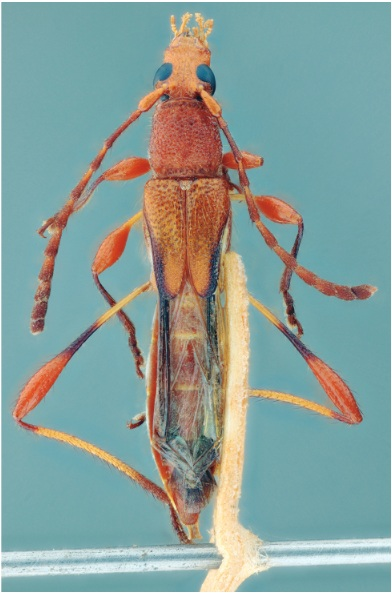

Scientific classification
- Kingdom: Animalia
- Phylum: Arthropoda
- Clade: Pancrustacea
- Class: Insecta
- Order: Coleoptera
- Suborder: Polyphaga
- Infraorder: Cucujiformia
- Family: Cerambycidae
- Genus: Ischasia
- Species: I. rufina

Binomial name
- Ischasia rufina Thomson, 1864

= Ischasia rufina =

Species of beetle

Ischasia rufina is a species of beetle in the family Cerambycidae. It was described by Thomson in 1864.
