= Tomopterus =

Scientific classification
- Kingdom: Animalia
- Phylum: Arthropoda
- Class: Insecta
- Order: Coleoptera
- Suborder: Polyphaga
- Infraorder: Cucujiformia
- Family: Cerambycidae
- Subfamily: Cerambycinae
- Tribe: Rhinotragini
- Genus: Tomopterus; Audinet-Serville, 1833

Genus of beetles

Tomopterus is a genus of beetles in the family Cerambycidae, containing the following species:

- Tomopterus albopilosus Zajciw, 1964
- Tomopterus aurantiacosignatus Zajciw, 1969
- Tomopterus basimaculatus Zajciw, 1964
- Tomopterus brevicornis Giesbert, 1996
- Tomopterus clavicornis Magno, 1995
- Tomopterus consobrinus Gounelle, 1911
- Tomopterus exilis Chemsak & Linsley, 1979
- Tomopterus flavofasciatus Fisher, 1947
- Tomopterus grossefoveolatus Zajciw, 1964
- Tomopterus kunayala Giesbert, 1996
- Tomopterus larroides White, 1855
- Tomopterus longicornis Zajciw, 1969
- Tomopterus obliquus Bates, 1870
- Tomopterus pictipennis Zajciw, 1969
- Tomopterus quadratipennis Bates, 1873
- Tomopterus rufotibialis (Zajciw, 1968)
- Tomopterus seabrai Magno, 1995
- Tomopterus servillei Magno, 1995
- Tomopterus similis Fisher, 1930
- Tomopterus staphylinus Audinet-Serville, 1833
- Tomopterus tetraspilotus Magno, 1995
- Tomopterus vespoides White, 1855
