= Stizocera melanura =

Scientific classification
- Kingdom: Animalia
- Phylum: Arthropoda
- Class: Insecta
- Order: Coleoptera
- Suborder: Polyphaga
- Infraorder: Cucujiformia
- Family: Cerambycidae
- Genus: Stizocera
- Species: S. melanura

Binomial name
- Stizocera melanura (Erichson in Schomburg, 1848)

Synonyms
- Sphaerion melanurum Erichson in Schomburgk, 1848

Species of beetle

Stizocera melanura is a species of beetle in the family Cerambycidae. It was described by W. F. Erichson in 1848. It was found in British Guiana (today Guyana).
