= Plistonax rafaeli =

Scientific classification
- Domain: Eukaryota
- Kingdom: Animalia
- Phylum: Arthropoda
- Class: Insecta
- Order: Coleoptera
- Suborder: Polyphaga
- Infraorder: Cucujiformia
- Family: Cerambycidae
- Genus: Plistonax
- Species: P. rafaeli

Binomial name
- Plistonax rafaeli Martins & Galileo, 2006

Species of beetle

Plistonax rafaeli is a species of beetle in the family Cerambycidae. It was described by Martins and Galileo in 2006.
