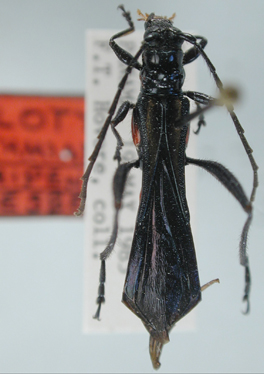
- Isthmiade vitripennis

Scientific classification
- Domain: Eukaryota
- Kingdom: Animalia
- Phylum: Arthropoda
- Class: Insecta
- Order: Coleoptera
- Suborder: Polyphaga
- Infraorder: Cucujiformia
- Family: Cerambycidae
- Tribe: Rhinotragini
- Genus: Isthmiade

= Isthmiade =

Genus of beetles

Isthmiade is a genus of beetles in the family Cerambycidae.

containing the following species:

- Isthmiade braconides (Perty, 1832)
- Isthmiade buirettei Tavakilian & Peñaherrera-Leiva, 2005
- Isthmiade cylindrica Zajciw, 1972
- Isthmiade ichneumoniformis Bates, 1870
- Isthmiade laevicollis Tippmann, 1953
- Isthmiade macilenta Bates, 1873
- Isthmiade martinsi Clarke, 2009
- Isthmiade modesta Gounelle, 1911
- Isthmiade necydalea (Linnaeus, 1758)
- Isthmiade parabraconides Giesbert, 1991
- Isthmiade perpulchra Linsley, 1961
- Isthmiade planifrons Zajciw, 1972
- Isthmiade rubra Bates, 1873
- Isthmiade rugosifrons Zajciw, 1972
- Isthmiade vitripennis Giesbert, 1991
- Isthmiade zamalloae Clarke, 2009
