= Pseudoeriphus collaris =

Scientific classification
- Domain: Eukaryota
- Kingdom: Animalia
- Phylum: Arthropoda
- Class: Insecta
- Order: Coleoptera
- Suborder: Polyphaga
- Infraorder: Cucujiformia
- Family: Cerambycidae
- Genus: Pseudoeriphus
- Species: P. collaris

Binomial name
- Pseudoeriphus collaris (Erichson, 1848)

Species of beetle

Pseudoeriphus collaris is a species of beetle in the family Cerambycidae. It was described by Wilhelm Ferdinand Erichson in 1848.
