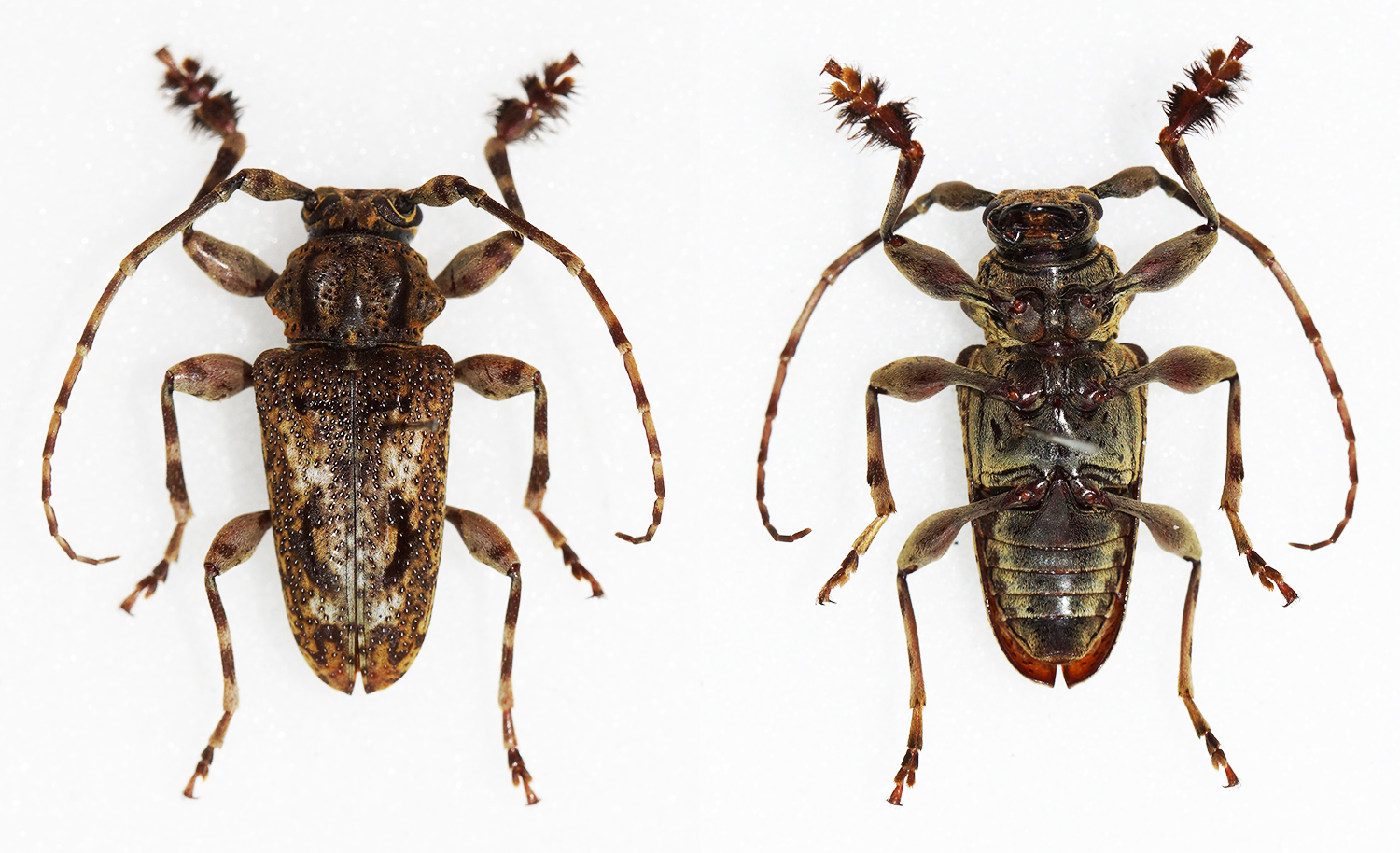

Scientific classification
- Domain: Eukaryota
- Kingdom: Animalia
- Phylum: Arthropoda
- Class: Insecta
- Order: Coleoptera
- Suborder: Polyphaga
- Infraorder: Cucujiformia
- Family: Cerambycidae
- Genus: Plistonax
- Species: P. albolinitus

Binomial name
- Plistonax albolinitus (Bates, 1861)

= Plistonax albolinitus =

Species of beetle

Plistonax albolinitus is a species of beetle in the family Cerambycidae. It was described by Bates in 1861.
