= Ischasia mareki =

Scientific classification
- Kingdom: Animalia
- Phylum: Arthropoda
- Class: Insecta
- Order: Coleoptera
- Suborder: Polyphaga
- Infraorder: Cucujiformia
- Family: Cerambycidae
- Genus: Ischasia
- Species: I. mareki

Binomial name
- Ischasia mareki Penaherrera-Leiva & Tavakilian, 2004

Species of beetle

Ischasia mareki is a species of beetle in the family Cerambycidae. It was described by Penaherrera-Leiva and Tavakilian in 2004.
