= Beraba grammica =

Scientific classification
- Kingdom: Animalia
- Phylum: Arthropoda
- Class: Insecta
- Order: Coleoptera
- Suborder: Polyphaga
- Infraorder: Cucujiformia
- Family: Cerambycidae
- Genus: Beraba
- Species: B. grammica

Binomial name
- Beraba grammica Martins & Monné, 1992

Species of beetle

Beraba grammica is a species of beetle in the family Cerambycidae.
