= Chlorotherion =

Scientific classification
- Domain: Eukaryota
- Kingdom: Animalia
- Phylum: Arthropoda
- Class: Insecta
- Order: Coleoptera
- Suborder: Polyphaga
- Infraorder: Cucujiformia
- Family: Cerambycidae
- Subfamily: Cerambycinae
- Tribe: Trachyderini
- Genus: Chlorotherion; Zajciw, 1962

Genus of beetles

Chlorotherion is a genus of beetles in the family Cerambycidae, containing the following species:

- Chlorotherion consimilis Zacjiw, 1962
- Chlorotherion punctatus Monné, 1998
