= Stizocera lissonota =

Scientific classification
- Kingdom: Animalia
- Phylum: Arthropoda
- Class: Insecta
- Order: Coleoptera
- Suborder: Polyphaga
- Infraorder: Cucujiformia
- Family: Cerambycidae
- Genus: Stizocera
- Species: S. lissonota

Binomial name
- Stizocera lissonota (Bates, 1870)

Species of beetle

Stizocera lissonota is a species of beetle in the family Cerambycidae. It was described by Bates in 1870.
