= Pseudogrammopsis =

Scientific classification
- Kingdom: Animalia
- Phylum: Arthropoda
- Class: Insecta
- Order: Coleoptera
- Suborder: Polyphaga
- Infraorder: Cucujiformia
- Family: Cerambycidae
- Genus: Pseudogrammopsis
- Species: P. lineata

Binomial name
- Pseudogrammopsis lineata Zajciw 1960

Genus of beetles

Pseudogrammopsis lineata is a species of beetle in the family Cerambycidae, and the only species in the genus Pseudogrammopsis. It was described by Zajciw in 1960.
