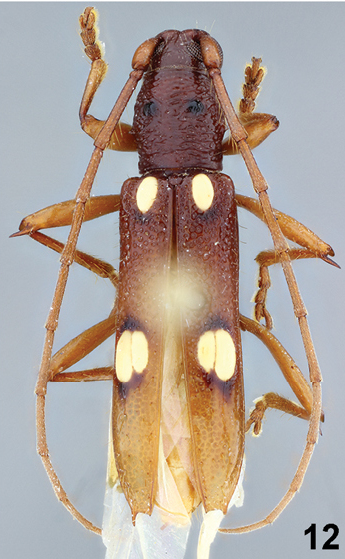

Scientific classification
- Kingdom: Animalia
- Phylum: Arthropoda
- Class: Insecta
- Order: Coleoptera
- Suborder: Polyphaga
- Infraorder: Cucujiformia
- Family: Cerambycidae
- Genus: Beraba
- Species: B. marica

Binomial name
- Beraba marica Galileo & Martins, 1999

= Beraba marica =

Species of beetle

Beraba marica is a species of beetle in the family Cerambycidae.
