= Callancyla malleri =

Scientific classification
- Domain: Eukaryota
- Kingdom: Animalia
- Phylum: Arthropoda
- Class: Insecta
- Order: Coleoptera
- Suborder: Polyphaga
- Infraorder: Cucujiformia
- Family: Cerambycidae
- Genus: Callancyla
- Species: C. malleri

Binomial name
- Callancyla malleri E. Fuchs, 1966

Species of beetle

Callancyla malleri is a species of beetle in the family Cerambycidae. It was described by Ernst Fuchs in 1966.
