= Stizocera laceyi =

Scientific classification
- Kingdom: Animalia
- Phylum: Arthropoda
- Class: Insecta
- Order: Coleoptera
- Suborder: Polyphaga
- Infraorder: Cucujiformia
- Family: Cerambycidae
- Genus: Stizocera
- Species: S. laceyi

Binomial name
- Stizocera laceyi Linsley, 1934

Species of beetle

Stizocera laceyi is a species of beetle in the family Cerambycidae. It was described by Linsley in 1934.
