= Plistonax difficilis =

Scientific classification
- Kingdom: Animalia
- Phylum: Arthropoda
- Clade: Pancrustacea
- Class: Insecta
- Order: Coleoptera
- Suborder: Polyphaga
- Infraorder: Cucujiformia
- Family: Cerambycidae
- Genus: Plistonax
- Species: P. difficilis

Binomial name
- Plistonax difficilis (Melzer, 1934)

Species of beetle

Plistonax difficilis is a species of beetle in the family Cerambycidae. It was described by Melzer in 1934. It is found in Peru, Bolivia (Beni, Santa Cruz), Brazil (Amazonas, Rondônia, Mato Grosso, Mato Grosso do Sul, Goiás, Paraíba, Minas Gerais, São Paulo, Paraná, Rio Grande do Sul), Paraguay and Argentina (Tucumán, Formosa).
