= Stizocera insulana =

Scientific classification
- Kingdom: Animalia
- Phylum: Arthropoda
- Class: Insecta
- Order: Coleoptera
- Suborder: Polyphaga
- Infraorder: Cucujiformia
- Family: Cerambycidae
- Genus: Stizocera
- Species: S. insulana

Binomial name
- Stizocera insulana (Gahan, 1895)

Species of beetle

Stizocera insulana is a species of beetle in the family Cerambycidae. It was described by Gahan in 1895.
