= Stizocera poeyi =

Scientific classification
- Kingdom: Animalia
- Phylum: Arthropoda
- Clade: Pancrustacea
- Class: Insecta
- Order: Coleoptera
- Suborder: Polyphaga
- Infraorder: Cucujiformia
- Family: Cerambycidae
- Genus: Stizocera
- Species: S. poeyi

Binomial name
- Stizocera poeyi (Guérin-Méneville, 1838)

Species of beetle

Stizocera poeyi is a species of beetle in the family Cerambycidae. It was described by Félix Édouard Guérin-Méneville in 1838.
