= Tomopterus staphylinus =

Scientific classification
- Kingdom: Animalia
- Phylum: Arthropoda
- Class: Insecta
- Order: Coleoptera
- Suborder: Polyphaga
- Infraorder: Cucujiformia
- Family: Cerambycidae
- Genus: Tomopterus
- Species: T. staphylinus

Binomial name
- Tomopterus staphylinus Audinet-Serville, 1833

Species of beetle

Tomopterus staphylinus is a species of beetle in the family Cerambycidae. It was described by Audinet-Serville in 1833.
