= Tomopterus obliquus =

Scientific classification
- Kingdom: Animalia
- Phylum: Arthropoda
- Class: Insecta
- Order: Coleoptera
- Suborder: Polyphaga
- Infraorder: Cucujiformia
- Family: Cerambycidae
- Genus: Tomopterus
- Species: T. obliquus

Binomial name
- Tomopterus obliquus Bates, 1870

Species of beetle

Tomopterus obliquus is a species of beetle in the family Cerambycidae. It was described by Henry Walter Bates in 1870.
