= Isthmiade martinsi =

Scientific classification
- Domain: Eukaryota
- Kingdom: Animalia
- Phylum: Arthropoda
- Class: Insecta
- Order: Coleoptera
- Suborder: Polyphaga
- Infraorder: Cucujiformia
- Family: Cerambycidae
- Genus: Isthmiade
- Species: I. martinsi

Binomial name
- Isthmiade martinsi Clarke, 2009

Species of beetle

Isthmiade martinsi is a species of beetle in the family Cerambycidae. It was described by Clarke in 2009.
