= Potiaxixa =

Scientific classification
- Domain: Eukaryota
- Kingdom: Animalia
- Phylum: Arthropoda
- Class: Insecta
- Order: Coleoptera
- Suborder: Polyphaga
- Infraorder: Cucujiformia
- Family: Cerambycidae
- Subfamily: Cerambycinae
- Tribe: Cerambycini
- Genus: Potiaxixa; Martins & Monné, 2002

Genus of beetles

Potiaxixa is a genus of beetles in the family Cerambycidae, containing the following species:

Species	First described	Range
Potiaxixa gounellei	(Zajciw, 1966)	Brazil, French Guiana, Suriname
Potiaxixa intermedia	(Martins, 1979)	South eastern Brazil
Potiaxixa longipennis	(Zajciw, 1966)	South eastern Brazil, French Guiana
