= Ischasia exigua =

Scientific classification
- Kingdom: Animalia
- Phylum: Arthropoda
- Class: Insecta
- Order: Coleoptera
- Suborder: Polyphaga
- Infraorder: Cucujiformia
- Family: Cerambycidae
- Genus: Ischasia
- Species: I. exigua

Binomial name
- Ischasia exigua Fisher, 1947

Species of beetle

Ischasia exigua is a species of beetle in the family Cerambycidae. It was described by Fisher in 1947.
