= Isthmiade braconides =

Scientific classification
- Domain: Eukaryota
- Kingdom: Animalia
- Phylum: Arthropoda
- Class: Insecta
- Order: Coleoptera
- Suborder: Polyphaga
- Infraorder: Cucujiformia
- Family: Cerambycidae
- Genus: Isthmiade
- Species: I. braconides

Binomial name
- Isthmiade braconides (Perty, 1832)

Species of beetle

Isthmiade braconides is a species of beetle in the family Cerambycidae. It was described by Perty in 1832.
