= Stizocera curacaoae =

Scientific classification
- Kingdom: Animalia
- Phylum: Arthropoda
- Class: Insecta
- Order: Coleoptera
- Suborder: Polyphaga
- Infraorder: Cucujiformia
- Family: Cerambycidae
- Genus: Stizocera
- Species: S. curacaoae

Binomial name
- Stizocera curacaoae Gilmour, 1968

Species of beetle

Stizocera curacaoae is a species of beetle in the family Cerambycidae. It was described by Gilmour in 1968.
