= Plistonax inopinatus =

Scientific classification
- Domain: Eukaryota
- Kingdom: Animalia
- Phylum: Arthropoda
- Class: Insecta
- Order: Coleoptera
- Suborder: Polyphaga
- Infraorder: Cucujiformia
- Family: Cerambycidae
- Genus: Plistonax
- Species: P. inopinatus

Binomial name
- Plistonax inopinatus Lane, 1960

Species of beetle

Plistonax inopinatus is a species of beetle in the family Cerambycidae. It was described by Lane in 1960.
