= Tomopterus similis =

Scientific classification
- Kingdom: Animalia
- Phylum: Arthropoda
- Class: Insecta
- Order: Coleoptera
- Suborder: Polyphaga
- Infraorder: Cucujiformia
- Family: Cerambycidae
- Genus: Tomopterus
- Species: T. similis

Binomial name
- Tomopterus similis Fisher, 1930

Species of beetle

Tomopterus similis is a species of beetle in the family Cerambycidae. It was described by Fisher in 1930.
