= Ischasia feuilleti =

Scientific classification
- Kingdom: Animalia
- Phylum: Arthropoda
- Class: Insecta
- Order: Coleoptera
- Suborder: Polyphaga
- Infraorder: Cucujiformia
- Family: Cerambycidae
- Genus: Ischasia
- Species: I. feuilleti

Binomial name
- Ischasia feuilleti Penaherrera-Leiva & Tavakilian, 2003

Species of beetle

Ischasia feuilleti is a species of beetle in the family Cerambycidae. It was described by Penaherrera-Leiva and Tavakilian in 2003.
