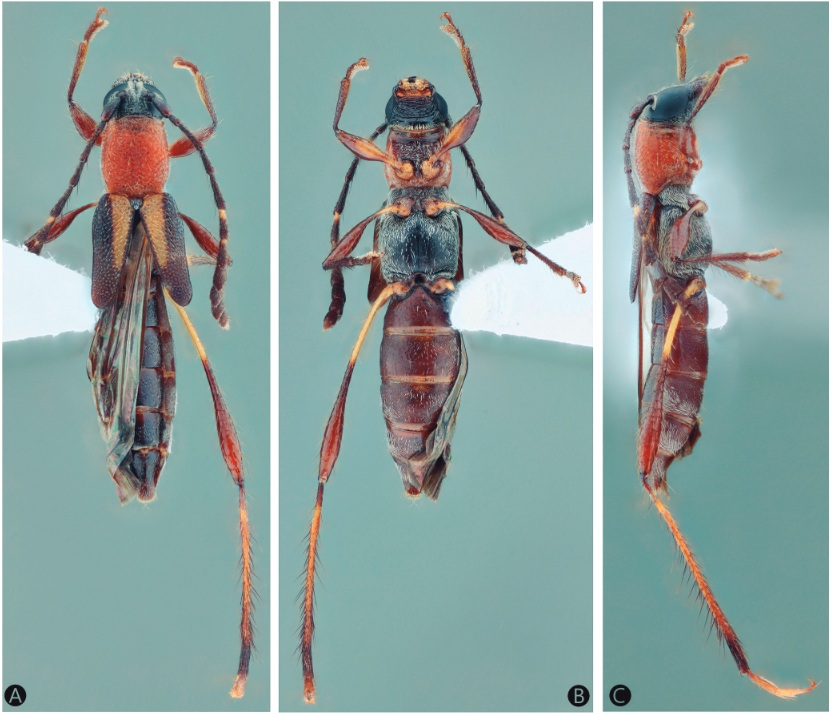

Scientific classification
- Kingdom: Animalia
- Phylum: Arthropoda
- Clade: Pancrustacea
- Class: Insecta
- Order: Coleoptera
- Suborder: Polyphaga
- Infraorder: Cucujiformia
- Family: Cerambycidae
- Genus: Ischasia
- Species: I. carlosgardeli

Binomial name
- Ischasia carlosgardeli Da Silva, Monne, Santos-Silva & Rafael, 2026

= Ischasia carlosgardeli =

Species of beetle

Ischasia carlosgardeli is a species of beetle of the family Cerambycidae. It is found in Brazil (Amazonas).

== Description ==
Adults reach a length of about 7 mm (0.28 in). The head capsule is blackish. The pronotum and sides of the prothorax are dark orangish brown, except for the brownish anterior margin of the pronotum. The scutellum is blackish and the elytra are dark brown, but darker anterolaterally, and there is a large, triangular dull yellowish‑brown area dorsally, from the base to the posterior third.

== Etymology ==
The species is named after the actor and tango singer Carlos Gardel.
