= Stizocera kawensis =

Scientific classification
- Kingdom: Animalia
- Phylum: Arthropoda
- Clade: Pancrustacea
- Class: Insecta
- Order: Coleoptera
- Suborder: Polyphaga
- Infraorder: Cucujiformia
- Family: Cerambycidae
- Genus: Stizocera
- Species: S. kawensis

Binomial name
- Stizocera kawensis Galileo & Martins, 2009

Species of beetle

Stizocera kawensis is a species of beetle in the family Cerambycidae. It was first described by Galileo and Martins in 2009.
