= Stizocera spinicornis =

Scientific classification
- Kingdom: Animalia
- Phylum: Arthropoda
- Class: Insecta
- Order: Coleoptera
- Suborder: Polyphaga
- Infraorder: Cucujiformia
- Family: Cerambycidae
- Genus: Stizocera
- Species: S. spinicornis

Binomial name
- Stizocera spinicornis (Fairmaire, 1864)

Species of beetle

Stizocera spinicornis is a species of beetle in the family Cerambycidae. It was described by Fairmaire in 1864.
