= Tomopterus flavofasciatus =

Scientific classification
- Kingdom: Animalia
- Phylum: Arthropoda
- Clade: Pancrustacea
- Class: Insecta
- Order: Coleoptera
- Suborder: Polyphaga
- Infraorder: Cucujiformia
- Family: Cerambycidae
- Genus: Tomopterus
- Species: T. flavofasciatus

Binomial name
- Tomopterus flavofasciatus Fisher, 1947

Species of beetle

Tomopterus flavofasciatus is a species of beetle in the family Cerambycidae. It was described by Fisher in 1947. It is found in Brazil (Bahia, Minas Gerais, Espírito Santo, Rio de Janeiro, São Paulo, Paraná, Santa Catarina, Rio Grande do Sul), Paraguay, Argentina (Misiones) and Uruguay.
