= Stizocera jassuara =

Scientific classification
- Kingdom: Animalia
- Phylum: Arthropoda
- Class: Insecta
- Order: Coleoptera
- Suborder: Polyphaga
- Infraorder: Cucujiformia
- Family: Cerambycidae
- Genus: Stizocera
- Species: S. jassuara

Binomial name
- Stizocera jassuara (Martins & Napp, 1983)

Species of beetle

Stizocera jassuara is a species of beetle in the family Cerambycidae. It was described by Martins and Napp in 1983.
