= Athetesis =

Scientific classification
- Domain: Eukaryota
- Kingdom: Animalia
- Phylum: Arthropoda
- Class: Insecta
- Order: Coleoptera
- Suborder: Polyphaga
- Infraorder: Cucujiformia
- Family: Cerambycidae
- Subfamily: Cerambycinae
- Tribe: Trachyderini
- Genus: Athetesis; Bates, 1870

Genus of beetles

Athetesis is a genus of beetles in the family Cerambycidae, containing the following species:

- Athetesis angulicollis (Zajciw, 1961)
- Athetesis prolixa Bates, 1870
