= Stizocera phtisica =

Scientific classification
- Kingdom: Animalia
- Phylum: Arthropoda
- Class: Insecta
- Order: Coleoptera
- Suborder: Polyphaga
- Infraorder: Cucujiformia
- Family: Cerambycidae
- Genus: Stizocera
- Species: S. phtisica

Binomial name
- Stizocera phtisica Gounelle, 1909

Species of beetle

Stizocera phtisica is a species of beetle in the family Cerambycidae. It was described by Gounelle in 1909.
