= Tomopterus exilis =

Scientific classification
- Kingdom: Animalia
- Phylum: Arthropoda
- Class: Insecta
- Order: Coleoptera
- Suborder: Polyphaga
- Infraorder: Cucujiformia
- Family: Cerambycidae
- Genus: Tomopterus
- Species: T. exilis

Binomial name
- Tomopterus exilis Chemsak & Linsley, 1979

Species of beetle

Tomopterus exilis is a species of beetle in the family Cerambycidae. It was described by Chemsak and Linsley in 1979.
