= Stizocera daudini =

Scientific classification
- Kingdom: Animalia
- Phylum: Arthropoda
- Class: Insecta
- Order: Coleoptera
- Suborder: Polyphaga
- Infraorder: Cucujiformia
- Family: Cerambycidae
- Genus: Stizocera
- Species: S. daudini

Binomial name
- Stizocera daudini Chalumeau & Touroult, 2005

Species of beetle

Stizocera daudini is a species of beetle in the family Cerambycidae. It was described by Chalumeau and Touroult in 2005.
