= Stizocera geniculata =

Scientific classification
- Kingdom: Animalia
- Phylum: Arthropoda
- Class: Insecta
- Order: Coleoptera
- Suborder: Polyphaga
- Infraorder: Cucujiformia
- Family: Cerambycidae
- Genus: Stizocera
- Species: S. geniculata

Binomial name
- Stizocera geniculata (Pascoe, 1866)

Species of beetle

Stizocera geniculata is a species of beetle in the family Cerambycidae. It was described by Pascoe in 1866.
