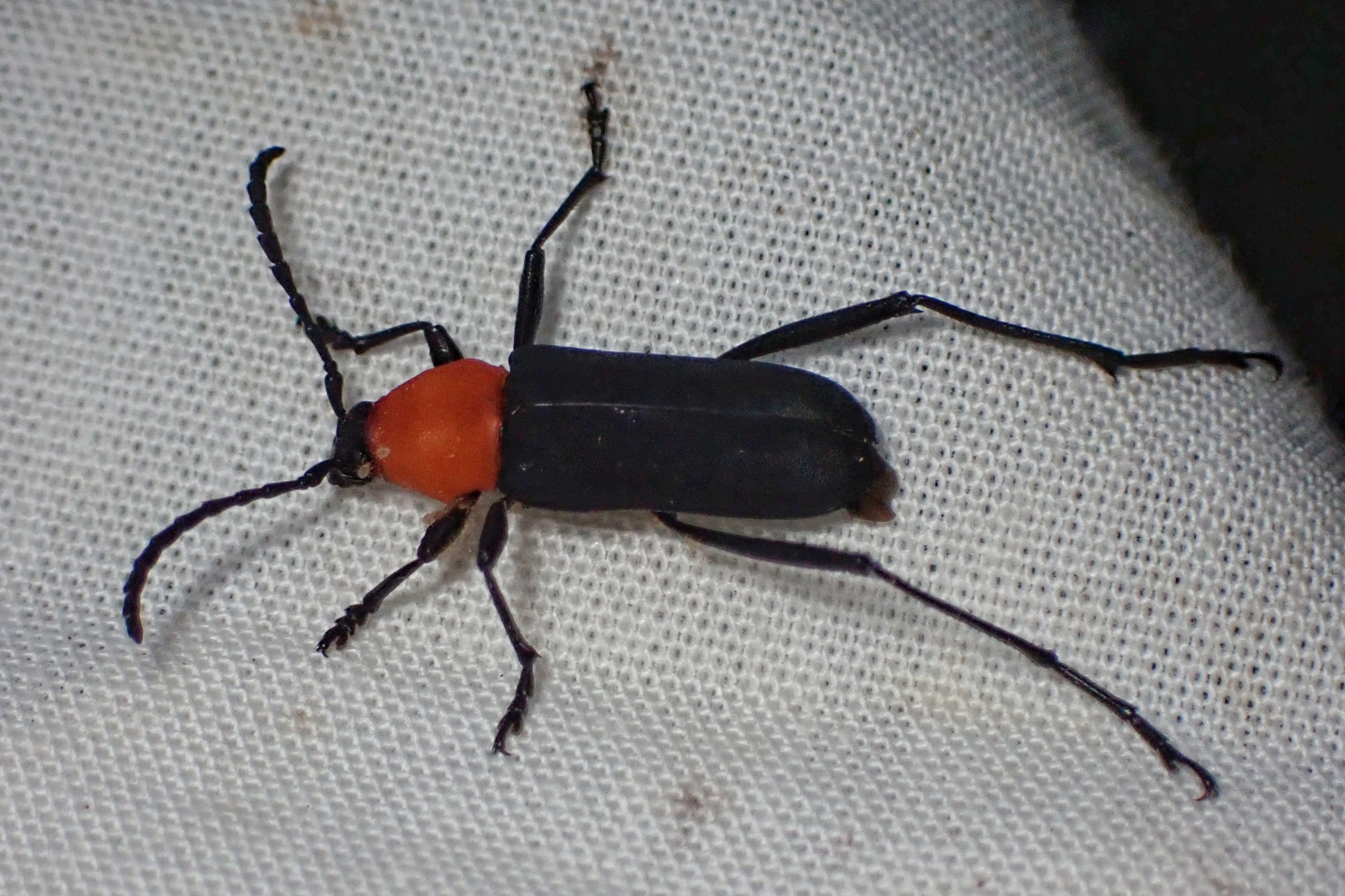

Scientific classification
- Kingdom: Animalia
- Phylum: Arthropoda
- Class: Insecta
- Order: Coleoptera
- Suborder: Polyphaga
- Infraorder: Cucujiformia
- Family: Cerambycidae
- Genus: Pseudoeriphus
- Species: P. robustus

Binomial name
- Pseudoeriphus robustus Tavakilian & Dalens, 2008

= Pseudoeriphus robustus =

Species of beetle

Pseudoeriphus robustus is a species of beetle in the family Cerambycidae. It was first described by Tavakilian & Dalens in 2008.
