= Stizocera nigroapicalis =

Scientific classification
- Kingdom: Animalia
- Phylum: Arthropoda
- Class: Insecta
- Order: Coleoptera
- Suborder: Polyphaga
- Infraorder: Cucujiformia
- Family: Cerambycidae
- Genus: Stizocera
- Species: S. nigroapicalis

Binomial name
- Stizocera nigroapicalis E. Fuchs, 1961

Species of beetle

Stizocera nigroapicalis is a species of beetle in the family Cerambycidae. It was described by Ernst Fuchs in 1961.
