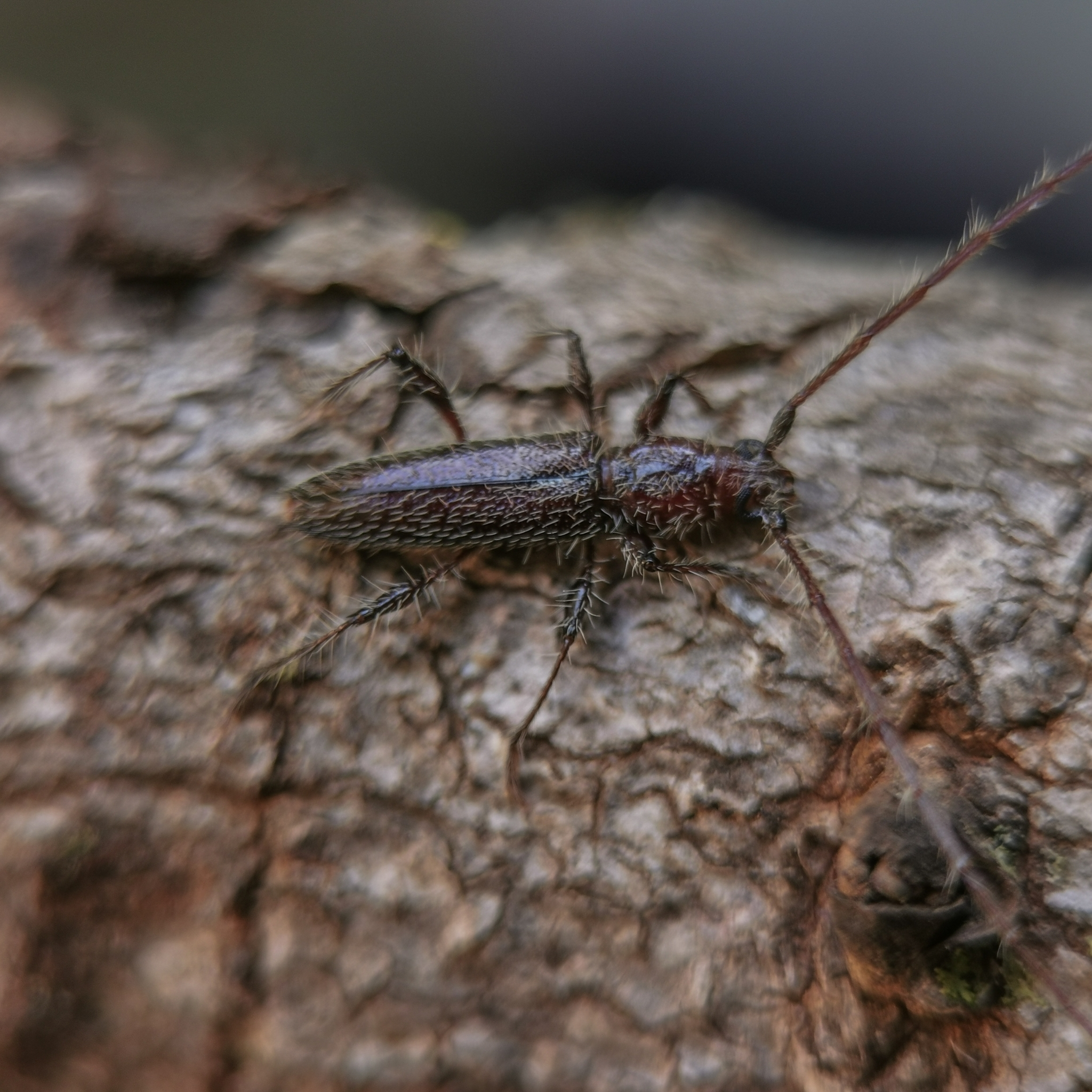

Scientific classification
- Kingdom: Animalia
- Phylum: Arthropoda
- Clade: Pancrustacea
- Class: Insecta
- Order: Coleoptera
- Suborder: Polyphaga
- Infraorder: Cucujiformia
- Family: Cerambycidae
- Genus: Stizocera
- Species: S. tristis

Binomial name
- Stizocera tristis (Guérin-Méneville, 1844)

= Stizocera tristis =

Species of beetle

Stizocera tristis is a species of beetle in the family Cerambycidae. It was described by Félix Édouard Guérin-Méneville in 1844.
