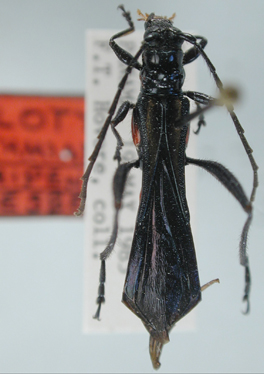
- Holotype specimen of a female Isthmiade Vitripennis

Scientific classification
- Domain: Eukaryota
- Kingdom: Animalia
- Phylum: Arthropoda
- Class: Insecta
- Order: Coleoptera
- Suborder: Polyphaga
- Infraorder: Cucujiformia
- Family: Cerambycidae
- Genus: Isthmiade
- Species: I. vitripennis

Binomial name
- Isthmiade vitripennis Giesbert, 1991

= Isthmiade vitripennis =

Isthmiade Vitripennis

Species of beetle

Isthmiade vitripennis is a species of beetle in the family Cerambycidae. It was described by Giesbert in 1991.
