= Tomopterus brevicornis =

Scientific classification
- Kingdom: Animalia
- Phylum: Arthropoda
- Class: Insecta
- Order: Coleoptera
- Suborder: Polyphaga
- Infraorder: Cucujiformia
- Family: Cerambycidae
- Genus: Tomopterus
- Species: T. brevicornis

Binomial name
- Tomopterus brevicornis Giesbert, 1996

Species of beetle

Tomopterus brevicornis is a species of beetle in the family Cerambycidae. It was described by Giesbert in 1996.
