= Urangaua =

Scientific classification
- Kingdom: Animalia
- Phylum: Arthropoda
- Class: Insecta
- Order: Coleoptera
- Suborder: Polyphaga
- Infraorder: Cucujiformia
- Family: Cerambycidae
- Tribe: Acanthoderini
- Genus: Urangaua

Genus of beetles

Urangaua is a genus of beetles in the family Cerambycidae, containing the following species:

- Urangaua analis (Melzer, 1935)
- Urangaua subanalis (Zajciw, 1964)
