= Stizocera meinerti =

Scientific classification
- Kingdom: Animalia
- Phylum: Arthropoda
- Class: Insecta
- Order: Coleoptera
- Suborder: Polyphaga
- Infraorder: Cucujiformia
- Family: Cerambycidae
- Genus: Stizocera
- Species: S. meinerti

Binomial name
- Stizocera meinerti (Aurivillius, 1900)

Species of beetle

Stizocera meinerti is a species of beetle in the family Cerambycidae. It was described by Per Olof Christopher Aurivillius in 1900.
