= Urangaua analis =

Scientific classification
- Kingdom: Animalia
- Phylum: Arthropoda
- Clade: Pancrustacea
- Class: Insecta
- Order: Coleoptera
- Suborder: Polyphaga
- Infraorder: Cucujiformia
- Family: Cerambycidae
- Genus: Urangaua
- Species: U. analis

Binomial name
- Urangaua analis (Melzer, 1935)

Species of beetle

Urangaua analis is a species of beetle in the family Cerambycidae. It was described by Melzer in 1935. It is found in Brazil (São Paulo, Paraná, Santa Catarina, Rio Grande do Sul), Paraguay and Argentina (Formosa).
