= Chlorotherion punctatus =

Scientific classification
- Domain: Eukaryota
- Kingdom: Animalia
- Phylum: Arthropoda
- Class: Insecta
- Order: Coleoptera
- Suborder: Polyphaga
- Infraorder: Cucujiformia
- Family: Cerambycidae
- Genus: Chlorotherion
- Species: C. punctatus

Binomial name
- Chlorotherion punctatus Monné, 1996

Species of beetle

Chlorotherion punctatus is a species of beetle in the family Cerambycidae. It was described by Monné in 1996.
