= Stizocera howdeni =

Scientific classification
- Kingdom: Animalia
- Phylum: Arthropoda
- Class: Insecta
- Order: Coleoptera
- Suborder: Polyphaga
- Infraorder: Cucujiformia
- Family: Cerambycidae
- Genus: Stizocera
- Species: S. howdeni

Binomial name
- Stizocera howdeni Gilmour, 1963

Species of beetle

Stizocera howdeni is a species of beetle belonging to the family Cerambycidae. It was described by Gilmour in 1963.
