= Stizocera vanzwaluwenburgi =

Scientific classification
- Kingdom: Animalia
- Phylum: Arthropoda
- Class: Insecta
- Order: Coleoptera
- Suborder: Polyphaga
- Infraorder: Cucujiformia
- Family: Cerambycidae
- Genus: Stizocera
- Species: S. vanzwaluwenburgi

Binomial name
- Stizocera vanzwaluwenburgi (Fisher, 1932)

Species of beetle

Stizocera vanzwaluwenburgi is a species of beetle in the family Cerambycidae. It was described by Fisher in 1932.
