= Isthmiade macilenta =

Scientific classification
- Domain: Eukaryota
- Kingdom: Animalia
- Phylum: Arthropoda
- Class: Insecta
- Order: Coleoptera
- Suborder: Polyphaga
- Infraorder: Cucujiformia
- Family: Cerambycidae
- Genus: Isthmiade
- Species: I. macilenta

Binomial name
- Isthmiade macilenta Bates, 1873

Species of beetle

Isthmiade macilenta is a species of beetle in the family Cerambycidae. It was described by Bates in 1873.
