= Tomopterus quadratipennis =

Scientific classification
- Kingdom: Animalia
- Phylum: Arthropoda
- Class: Insecta
- Order: Coleoptera
- Suborder: Polyphaga
- Infraorder: Cucujiformia
- Family: Cerambycidae
- Genus: Tomopterus
- Species: T. quadratipennis

Binomial name
- Tomopterus quadratipennis Bates, 1873

Species of beetle

Tomopterus quadratipennis is a species of beetle in the family Cerambycidae. It was described by Henry Walter Bates in 1873.
