= Ischasia cuneiformis =

Scientific classification
- Kingdom: Animalia
- Phylum: Arthropoda
- Class: Insecta
- Order: Coleoptera
- Suborder: Polyphaga
- Infraorder: Cucujiformia
- Family: Cerambycidae
- Genus: Ischasia
- Species: I. cuneiformis

Binomial name
- Ischasia cuneiformis Fisher, 1952

Species of beetle

Ischasia cuneiformis is a species of beetle in the family Cerambycidae. It was described by Fisher in 1952.
