= Beraba angusticollis =

Scientific classification
- Kingdom: Animalia
- Phylum: Arthropoda
- Class: Insecta
- Order: Coleoptera
- Suborder: Polyphaga
- Infraorder: Cucujiformia
- Family: Cerambycidae
- Genus: Beraba
- Species: B. angusticollis

Binomial name
- Beraba angusticollis (Zajciw, 1961)

Species of beetle

Beraba angusticollis is a species of beetle in the family Cerambycidae. It was described by Zajciw in 1961. The holotype is held in the University of Rio de Janeiro and a photo is available.

== Description ==
The beetle is light brown in colour with 4 white spots on the elytra. The antennae are long and extend beyond the body.
