= Ischasia =

Scientific classification
- Kingdom: Animalia
- Phylum: Arthropoda
- Clade: Pancrustacea
- Class: Insecta
- Order: Coleoptera
- Suborder: Polyphaga
- Infraorder: Cucujiformia
- Family: Cerambycidae
- Subfamily: Cerambycinae
- Tribe: Rhinotragini
- Genus: Ischasia; Thomson, 1864

Genus of beetles

Ischasia is a genus of beetles in the family Cerambycidae, containing the following species:

- Ischasia carlosgardeli Da Silva, Monne, Santos-Silva & Rafael, 2026
- Ischasia cuneiformis Fisher, 1952
- Ischasia ecclinusae Penaherrera-Leiva & Tavakilian, 2004
- Ischasia exigua Fisher, 1947
- Ischasia feuilleti Penaherrera-Leiva & Tavakilian, 2003
- Ischasia indica Giesbert, 1991
- Ischasia linsleyi Giesbert, 1996
- Ischasia mareki Penaherrera-Leiva & Tavakilian, 2004
- Ischasia nevermanni Fisher, 1947
- Ischasia nigripes Zajciw, 1973
- Ischasia picticornis Zajciw, 1973
- Ischasia pouteriae Penaherrera-Leiva & Tavakilian, 2004
- Ischasia rufina Thomson, 1864
- Ischasia sabatieri Penaherrera-Leiva & Tavakilian, 2004
- Ischasia valida Gounelle, 1911
- Ischasia viridithorax Penaherrera-Leiva & Tavakilian, 2004
