= Stizocera delicata =

Scientific classification
- Kingdom: Animalia
- Phylum: Arthropoda
- Class: Insecta
- Order: Coleoptera
- Suborder: Polyphaga
- Infraorder: Cucujiformia
- Family: Cerambycidae
- Genus: Stizocera
- Species: S. delicata

Binomial name
- Stizocera delicata Lingafelter, 2004

Species of beetle

Stizocera delicata is a species of beetle in the family Cerambycidae. It was described by Lingafelter in 2004.
