= Stizocera elegantula =

Scientific classification
- Kingdom: Animalia
- Phylum: Arthropoda
- Class: Insecta
- Order: Coleoptera
- Suborder: Polyphaga
- Infraorder: Cucujiformia
- Family: Cerambycidae
- Genus: Stizocera
- Species: S. elegantula

Binomial name
- Stizocera elegantula (Perroud, 1855)

Species of beetle

Stizocera elegantula is a species of beetle in the family Cerambycidae. It was described by Perroud in 1855.
