= Seabraia zajciwi =

Scientific classification
- Kingdom: Animalia
- Phylum: Arthropoda
- Class: Insecta
- Order: Coleoptera
- Suborder: Polyphaga
- Infraorder: Cucujiformia
- Family: Cerambycidae
- Genus: Seabraia
- Species: S. zajciwi

Binomial name
- Seabraia zajciwi Lane, 1965

Species of beetle

Seabraia zajciwi is a species of beetle in the family Cerambycidae. It was described by Lane in 1965.
