= Stizocera armata =

Scientific classification
- Kingdom: Animalia
- Phylum: Arthropoda
- Class: Insecta
- Order: Coleoptera
- Suborder: Polyphaga
- Infraorder: Cucujiformia
- Family: Cerambycidae
- Genus: Stizocera
- Species: S. armata

Binomial name
- Stizocera armata Audinet-Serville, 1834

Species of beetle

Stizocera armata is a species of beetle in the family Cerambycidae. It was described by Audinet-Serville in 1834.
