= Stizocera armigera =

Scientific classification
- Kingdom: Animalia
- Phylum: Arthropoda
- Class: Insecta
- Order: Coleoptera
- Suborder: Polyphaga
- Infraorder: Cucujiformia
- Family: Cerambycidae
- Genus: Stizocera
- Species: S. armigera

Binomial name
- Stizocera armigera (White, 1853)

Species of beetle

Stizocera armigera is a species of beetle in the family Cerambycidae. It was described by White in 1853.
