= Stizocera boyi =

Scientific classification
- Kingdom: Animalia
- Phylum: Arthropoda
- Class: Insecta
- Order: Coleoptera
- Suborder: Polyphaga
- Infraorder: Cucujiformia
- Family: Cerambycidae
- Genus: Stizocera
- Species: S. boyi

Binomial name
- Stizocera boyi Melzer, 1927

Species of beetle

Stizocera boyi is a species of beetle in the family Cerambycidae. It was described by Melzer in 1927.
