= Stizocera plicicollis =

Scientific classification
- Kingdom: Animalia
- Phylum: Arthropoda
- Class: Insecta
- Order: Coleoptera
- Suborder: Polyphaga
- Infraorder: Cucujiformia
- Family: Cerambycidae
- Genus: Stizocera
- Species: S. plicicollis

Binomial name
- Stizocera plicicollis (Germar, 1824)

Species of beetle

Stizocera plicicollis is a species of beetle in the family Cerambycidae. It was described by Ernst Friedrich Germar in 1824.
