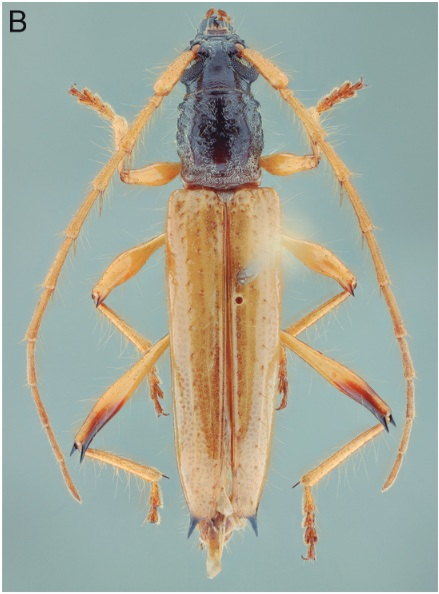
- Stizocera sublaevigata

Scientific classification
- Kingdom: Animalia
- Phylum: Arthropoda
- Clade: Pancrustacea
- Class: Insecta
- Order: Coleoptera
- Suborder: Polyphaga
- Infraorder: Cucujiformia
- Family: Cerambycidae
- Subfamily: Cerambycinae
- Tribe: Elaphidiini
- Genus: Stizocera; Audinet-Serville, 1834

= Stizocera =

Genus of beetles

Stizocera is a genus of beetles in the family Cerambycidae, containing the following species:

- Stizocera armata Audinet-Serville, 1834
- Stizocera armigera (White, 1853)
- Stizocera asyka Galileo & Martins, 2004
- Stizocera atiaia (Martins & Napp, 1983)
- Stizocera bisignata Zajciw, 1958
- Stizocera boyi Melzer, 1927
- Stizocera caymanensis Fisher, 1941
- Stizocera consobrina Gounelle, 1909
- Stizocera curacaoae Gilmour, 1968
- Stizocera daudini Chalumeau & Touroult, 2005
- Stizocera debilis Galileo & Martins, 2010
- Stizocera delicata Lingafelter, 2004
- Stizocera diversispinis Zajciw, 1962
- Stizocera dozieri (Fisher, 1947)
- Stizocera elegantula (Perroud, 1855)
- †Stizocera evanescens Vitali, 2010
- Stizocera floridana Linsley, 1949
- Stizocera fragilis (Bates, 1870)
- Stizocera geniculata (Pascoe, 1866)
- Stizocera horni Melzer, 1923
- Stizocera howdeni Gilmour, 1963
- Stizocera ichilo Lingafelter, 2004
- Stizocera insolita Gilmour, 1968
- Stizocera insulana (Gahan, 1895)
- Stizocera jamaicensis Vitali, 2007
- Stizocera jassuara (Martins & Napp, 1983)
- Stizocera juati Martins & Napp, 1983
- Stizocera kawensis Galileo & Martins, 2009
- Stizocera laceyi Linsley, 1934
- Stizocera lissonota (Bates, 1870)
- Stizocera longicollis Zajciw, 1963
- Stizocera meinerti (Aurivillius, 1900)
- Stizocera melanura (Erichson in Schomburg, 1848)
- Stizocera mojuba Martins & Napp, 1983
- Stizocera nigroapicalis Fuchs, 1961
- Stizocera nigroflava Zajciw, 1965
- Stizocera pantonyssoides Zajciw, 1968
- Stizocera phtisica Gounelle, 1909
- Stizocera plicicollis (Germar, 1824)
- Stizocera plumbea Gounelle, 1909
- Stizocera poeyi (Guérin-Méneville, 1838)
- Stizocera punctatissima Martins, 2005
- Stizocera rugicollis (Guérin-Méneville, 1844)
- Stizocera seminigra Martins & Napp, 1983
- Stizocera spinicornis (Fairmaire, 1864)
- Stizocera sublaevigata Zajciw, 1962
- Stizocera submetallica (Chemsak & Linsley, 1968)
- Stizocera suturalis (Martins & Napp, 1992)
- Stizocera tristis (Guérin-Méneville, 1844)
- Stizocera vanzwaluwenburgi (Fisher, 1932)
- Stizocera wagneri (Gounelle, 1913)
