= Stizocera debilis =

Scientific classification
- Kingdom: Animalia
- Phylum: Arthropoda
- Class: Insecta
- Order: Coleoptera
- Suborder: Polyphaga
- Infraorder: Cucujiformia
- Family: Cerambycidae
- Genus: Stizocera
- Species: S. debilis

Binomial name
- Stizocera debilis Galileo & Martins, 2010

Species of beetle

Stizocera debilis is a species of beetle in the family Cerambycidae. It was described by Galileo and Martins in 2010.
