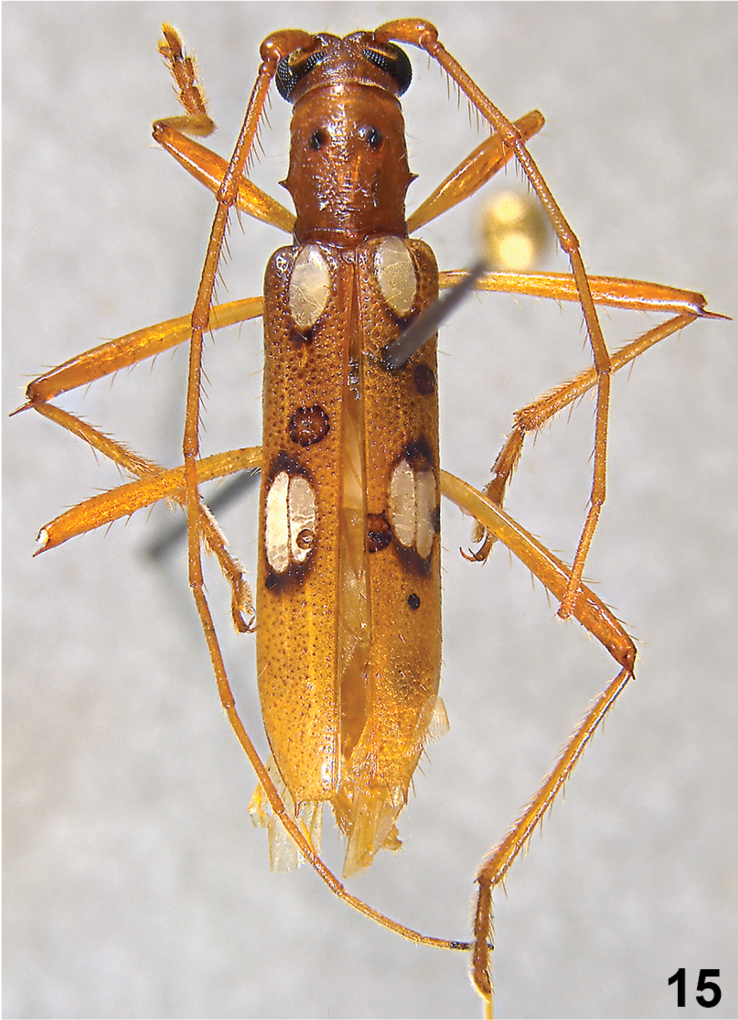
- Beraba limpida

Scientific classification
- Kingdom: Animalia
- Phylum: Arthropoda
- Class: Insecta
- Order: Coleoptera
- Suborder: Polyphaga
- Infraorder: Cucujiformia
- Family: Cerambycidae
- Subfamily: Cerambycinae
- Tribe: Eburiini
- Genus: Beraba; Martins, 1997

= Beraba =

Genus of beetles

Beraba is a genus of beetles in the family Cerambycidae, containing the following species:

- Beraba angusticollis (Zajciw, 1961)
- Beraba cauera Galileo & Martins, 1999
- Beraba cheilaria (Martins, 1967)
- Beraba decora (Zajciw, 1961)
- Beraba erosa (Martins, 1981)
- Beraba grammica (Monné & Martins, 1992)
- Beraba inermis Martins & Galileo, 2002
- Beraba iuba Martins, 1997
- Beraba limpida Martins, 1997
- Beraba longicollis (Bates, 1870)
- Beraba marica Galileo & Martins, 1999
- Beraba moema Martins, 1997
- Beraba odettae Martins & Galileo, 2008
- Beraba pallida Galileo & Martins, 2008
- Beraba piriana Martins, 1997
- Beraba spinosa (Zajciw, 1967)
- Beraba tate Galileo & Martins, 2010
