= Tomopterus larroides =

Scientific classification
- Kingdom: Animalia
- Phylum: Arthropoda
- Class: Insecta
- Order: Coleoptera
- Suborder: Polyphaga
- Infraorder: Cucujiformia
- Family: Cerambycidae
- Genus: Tomopterus
- Species: T. larroides

Binomial name
- Tomopterus larroides White, 1855

Species of beetle

Tomopterus larroides is a species of beetle in the family Cerambycidae. It was described by White in 1855.
