= Pseudoeriphus =

Scientific classification
- Domain: Eukaryota
- Kingdom: Animalia
- Phylum: Arthropoda
- Class: Insecta
- Order: Coleoptera
- Suborder: Polyphaga
- Infraorder: Cucujiformia
- Family: Cerambycidae
- Subfamily: Cerambycinae
- Tribe: Trachyderini
- Genus: Pseudoeriphus; Zajciw, 1961

Genus of beetles

Pseudoeriphus is a genus of beetles in the family Cerambycidae, containing the following species:

- Pseudoeriphus collaris (Erichson in Schomburg, 1848)
- Pseudoeriphus robustus Tavakilian & Dalens, 2008
- Pseudoeriphus sanguinicollis Zajciw, 1961
