= Stizocera evanescens =

Stizocera evanescens Temporal range: Burdigalian

Scientific classification
- Kingdom: Animalia
- Phylum: Arthropoda
- Clade: Pancrustacea
- Class: Insecta
- Order: Coleoptera
- Suborder: Polyphaga
- Infraorder: Cucujiformia
- Family: Cerambycidae
- Genus: Stizocera
- Species: †S. evanescens

Binomial name
- †Stizocera evanescens Vitali, 2010

Extinct species of beetle

Stizocera evanescens is an extinct species of beetle in the family Cerambycidae. It was described by Vitali in 2010.
