= Tomopterus servillei =

Scientific classification
- Kingdom: Animalia
- Phylum: Arthropoda
- Class: Insecta
- Order: Coleoptera
- Suborder: Polyphaga
- Infraorder: Cucujiformia
- Family: Cerambycidae
- Genus: Tomopterus
- Species: T. servillei

Binomial name
- Tomopterus servillei Magno, 1995

Species of beetle

Tomopterus servillei is a species of beetle in the family Cerambycidae. It was described by Magno in 1995.
