= Stizocera jamaicensis =

Scientific classification
- Kingdom: Animalia
- Phylum: Arthropoda
- Class: Insecta
- Order: Coleoptera
- Suborder: Polyphaga
- Infraorder: Cucujiformia
- Family: Cerambycidae
- Genus: Stizocera
- Species: S. jamaicensis

Binomial name
- Stizocera jamaicensis Vitali, 2007

Species of beetle

Stizocera jamaicensis is a species of beetle in the family Cerambycidae. It was described by Vitali in 2007.
