= Isthmiade buirettei =

Scientific classification
- Domain: Eukaryota
- Kingdom: Animalia
- Phylum: Arthropoda
- Class: Insecta
- Order: Coleoptera
- Suborder: Polyphaga
- Infraorder: Cucujiformia
- Family: Cerambycidae
- Genus: Isthmiade
- Species: I. buirettei

Binomial name
- Isthmiade buirettei Tavakilian & Peñaherrera-Leiva, 2005

Species of beetle

Isthmiade buirettei is a species of beetle in the family Cerambycidae. It was described by Tavakilian and Peñaherrera-Leiva in 2005.
