= Beraba cauera =

Scientific classification
- Kingdom: Animalia
- Phylum: Arthropoda
- Class: Insecta
- Order: Coleoptera
- Suborder: Polyphaga
- Infraorder: Cucujiformia
- Family: Cerambycidae
- Genus: Beraba
- Species: B. cauera

Binomial name
- Beraba cauera Galileo & Martins, 1999

Species of beetle

Beraba cauera is a species of beetle in the family Cerambycidae. It was described by Galileo and Martins in 1999.
