= Isthmiade ichneumoniformis =

Scientific classification
- Domain: Eukaryota
- Kingdom: Animalia
- Phylum: Arthropoda
- Class: Insecta
- Order: Coleoptera
- Suborder: Polyphaga
- Infraorder: Cucujiformia
- Family: Cerambycidae
- Genus: Isthmiade
- Species: I. ichneumoniformis

Binomial name
- Isthmiade ichneumoniformis Bates, 1870

Species of beetle

Isthmiade ichneumoniformis is a species of beetle in the family Cerambycidae. It was described by Bates in 1870.
