= Stizocera asyka =

Scientific classification
- Kingdom: Animalia
- Phylum: Arthropoda
- Class: Insecta
- Order: Coleoptera
- Suborder: Polyphaga
- Infraorder: Cucujiformia
- Family: Cerambycidae
- Genus: Stizocera
- Species: S. asyka

Binomial name
- Stizocera asyka Galileo & Martins, 2004

Species of beetle

Stizocera asyka is a species of beetle in the family Cerambycidae. It was described by Galileo and Martins in 2004.
