= Potiaxixa intermedia =

Scientific classification
- Domain: Eukaryota
- Kingdom: Animalia
- Phylum: Arthropoda
- Class: Insecta
- Order: Coleoptera
- Suborder: Polyphaga
- Infraorder: Cucujiformia
- Family: Cerambycidae
- Subfamily: Cerambycinae
- Tribe: Cerambycini
- Genus: Potiaxixa
- Species: P. intermedia

Binomial name
- Potiaxixa intermedia (Martins, 1979)

Synonyms
- Brasilianus intermedius Martins, 1979

Species of beetle

Potiaxixa intermedia is a species in the longhorn beetle family Cerambycidae. It is known from southeastern Brazil.
