= Potiaxixa longipennis =

Scientific classification
- Domain: Eukaryota
- Kingdom: Animalia
- Phylum: Arthropoda
- Class: Insecta
- Order: Coleoptera
- Suborder: Polyphaga
- Infraorder: Cucujiformia
- Family: Cerambycidae
- Subfamily: Cerambycinae
- Tribe: Cerambycini
- Genus: Potiaxixa
- Species: P. longipennis

Binomial name
- Potiaxixa longipennis (Zajciw, 1966)

Synonyms
- Brasilianus longipennis Monné & Giesbert, 1994

Species of beetle

Potiaxixa longipennis is a species in the longhorn beetle family Cerambycidae. It is found in southeastern Brazil and French Guiana.
