= Callancyla croceicollis =

Scientific classification
- Domain: Eukaryota
- Kingdom: Animalia
- Phylum: Arthropoda
- Class: Insecta
- Order: Coleoptera
- Suborder: Polyphaga
- Infraorder: Cucujiformia
- Family: Cerambycidae
- Genus: Callancyla
- Species: C. croceicollis

Binomial name
- Callancyla croceicollis (White, 1855)

Species of beetle

Callancyla croceicollis is a species of beetle in the family Cerambycidae. It was described by White in 1855.
