= Beraba piriana =

Scientific classification
- Kingdom: Animalia
- Phylum: Arthropoda
- Class: Insecta
- Order: Coleoptera
- Suborder: Polyphaga
- Infraorder: Cucujiformia
- Family: Cerambycidae
- Genus: Beraba
- Species: B. piriana

Binomial name
- Beraba piriana Martins, 1997

Species of beetle

Beraba piriana is a species of beetle in the family Cerambycidae.
