= Stizocera floridana =

Scientific classification
- Kingdom: Animalia
- Phylum: Arthropoda
- Class: Insecta
- Order: Coleoptera
- Suborder: Polyphaga
- Infraorder: Cucujiformia
- Family: Cerambycidae
- Genus: Stizocera
- Species: S. floridana

Binomial name
- Stizocera floridana Linsley, 1949

Species of beetle

Stizocera floridana is a species of beetle in the family Cerambycidae. It was described by Linsley in 1949. It can grow to 13 mm. It is found in Lee County Florida.
