= Callancyla =

Scientific classification
- Domain: Eukaryota
- Kingdom: Animalia
- Phylum: Arthropoda
- Class: Insecta
- Order: Coleoptera
- Suborder: Polyphaga
- Infraorder: Cucujiformia
- Family: Cerambycidae
- Subfamily: Cerambycinae
- Tribe: Trachyderini
- Genus: Callancyla; Aurivillius, 1912

Genus of beetles

Callancyla is a genus of beetles in the family Cerambycidae, containing the following species:

- Callancyla atrocoerulea Zajciw, 1970
- Callancyla bimaculata (Gounelle, 1911)
- Callancyla capixaba Monné, 1997
- Callancyla cribellum (Bates, 1885)
- Callancyla croceicollis (White, 1855)
- Callancyla curvicollis (Buquet, 1857)
- Callancyla malleri Fuchs, 1966
- Callancyla tucumana Viana, 1971
