= Vladimir Palladin =

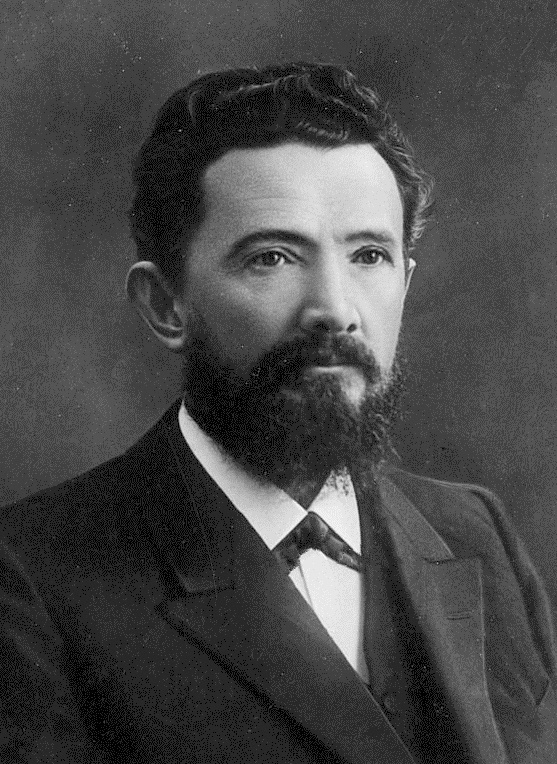
- Born: Vladimir Ivanovich Palladin; June 23 [O.S. June 11] 1859; Moscow, Russian Empire
- Died: 3 February 1922 (aged 62); Leningrad, Soviet Union
- Scientific career
- Fields: Biochemistry and botany
- Doctoral advisor: Kliment Timiryazev

Vladimir Ivanovich Palladin (Russian: Влади́мир Ива́нович Палла́дин; June 23 [O.S. June 11] 1859 – 3 February 1922) was a Russian and Soviet biochemist and botanist, a member of Saint Petersburg of Academy of Sciences. After graduating in 1883 from the Moscow State University, in 1886 he defended a PhD and in 1889 a habilitation on the role of oxygen in metabolism in plants. He later became professor of universities in Kharkiv (1889), Warsaw (1897) and Saint Petersburg (1901–1914). Palladin is one of the founders of the theory of metabolism in plants and of a school of Russian scientists studying the associated processes. His son Aleksandr Palladin became president of Academy of Sciences of Ukraine.
