= V. Dokuchaev Kharkiv National Agrarian University =

Agricultural university in Kharkiv, Ukraine

Kharkiv National Agrarian University named after V.V. Dokuchayev
- Ukrainian: Харківський національний аграрний університет ім. В.В. Докучаєва, romanized: Kharkivskyi natsionalnyi ahrarnyi universytet im. V.V. Dokuchaieva
- Former names: Kharkiv State Agrarian University named after V.V. Dokuchayev (1991); Kharkiv Agricultural Institute named after V.V. Dokuchayev (1946); Kharkiv Agricultural Institute (1921)
- Motto in English: 200 years of traditions in higher agricultural education
- Type: Public, undergraduate, graduate, postgraduate
- Active: 1816; 210 years ago–2021
- Affiliations: State University of Biotechnology (since 2021); Ministry of Education and Science of Ukraine
- Rector: Oleksandr Ulyanchenko
- Academic staff: 294
- Students: 3500
- Postgraduates: 130
- Location: p/o Dokuchayevs'ke-2, Dokuchayevs'ke, Kharkiv Raion, Kharkiv Oblast, 62483, Ukraine
- Campus: Suburban
- Language: Ukrainian, Russian, English
- Website: knau.kharkov.ua

The Kharkiv National Agrarian University named after V.V.Dokuchayev is a former state-sponsored higher education institution of IV level of accreditation subordinated to the Ministry of Education and Science of Ukraine. Located in the village of Dokuchayivske (the suburb of Kharkiv city), Kharkiv Raion, Kharkiv Oblast, in 2021 joined the State University of Biotechnology (Kharkiv, since 2021) as its constituent part.

== History ==
The roots of the university began in the Agricultural Institute, founded on 5 October 1816 in Marymont (the suburb of Warsaw, Poland) by the Decree of emperor Alexander І. and has common origins with the Warsaw University of Life Sciences.The Agricultural Institute was renamed into the Marymont Institute of Agriculture and Forestry after joining to it the Warsaw Forest School in 1840. In 1862 the institute was relocated to the Pulawy in the Lublin province, where it was named the Nowoaleksandryjski Institute of Agriculture and Forestry. The institute was in Pulawy before the World War I. In 1914, it was evacuated to Kharkiv

In 1921, the institute was rebuilt under the new name of Kharkiv Agricultural Institute.

The institute was evacuated to the city of Kattakurgan of the Uzbek SSR during World War II. In October 1944, it was returned to Kharkiv. The Institute in March 1946 received the name of soil scientist of V.V. Dokuchayev on the 360th anniversary of his birth.

In 1991, the institute was transformed into the Kharkiv State Agrarian University named after V.V. Dokuchayev. National status to the university was granted in March 2002.

== Campus, buildings and sites ==
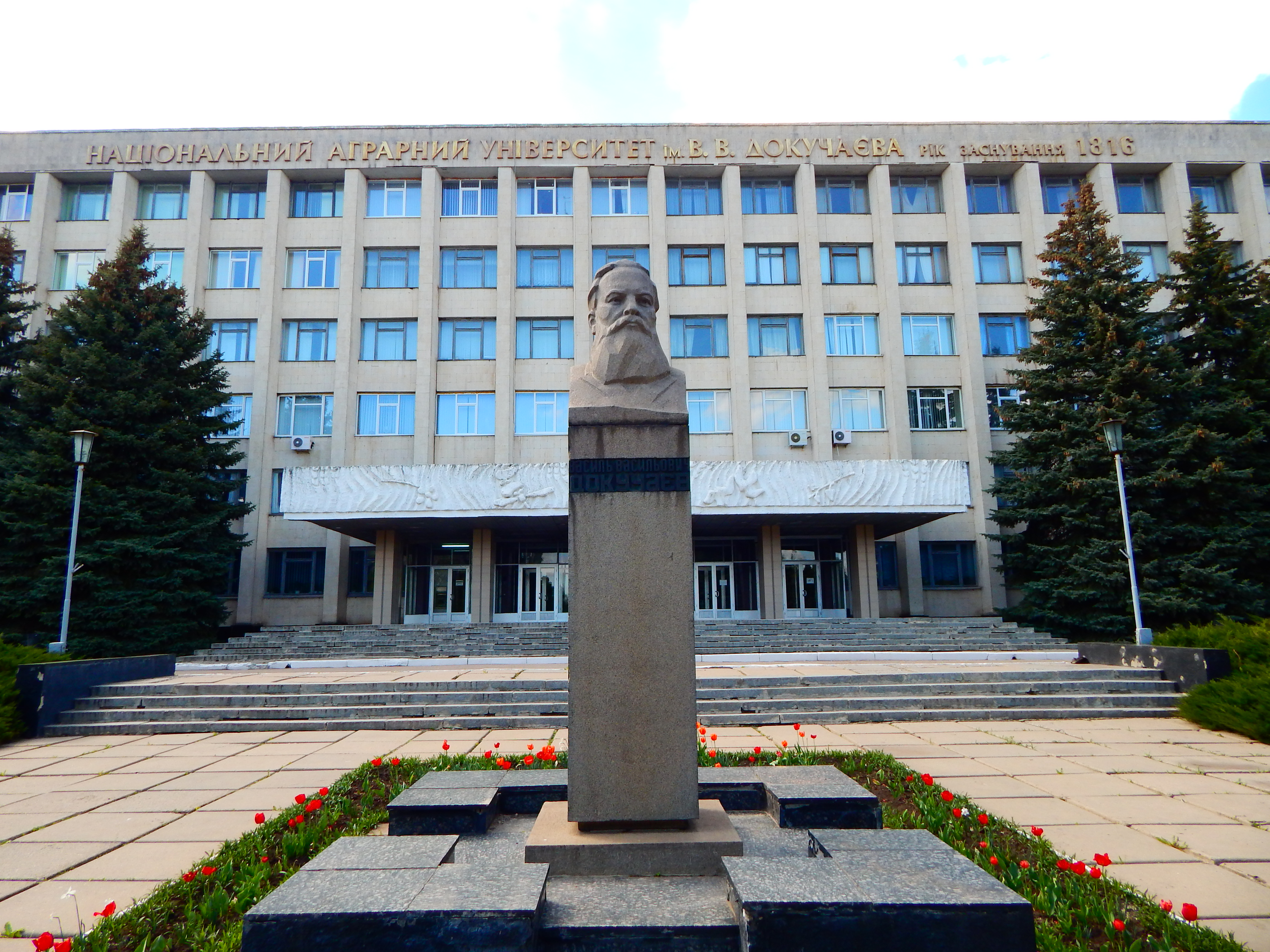
Monument to V.V. Dokuchayev

The university campus is situated outside the city of Kharkiv (2 km from the city boundaries and 25 km from downtown). The university consists of six buildings incorporated between themselves. Scientific and educational base: library (more than 600 thousand copies of scientific and educational literature); experimental farm (2 thousand ha); experimental field (70 ha); educational and experimental forestry farm (8 thousand ha).

=== Park ===
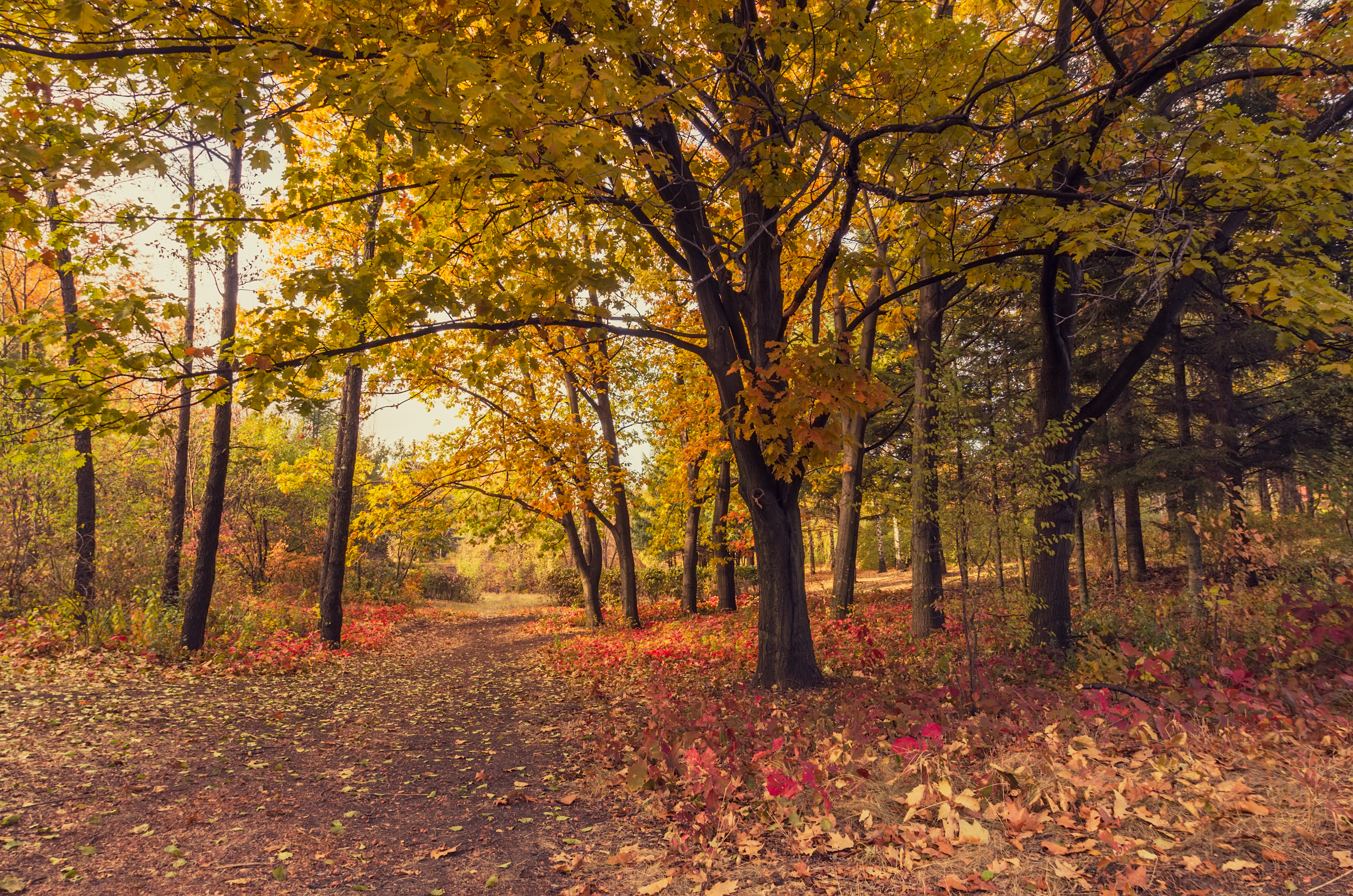
Dendrology park in autumn

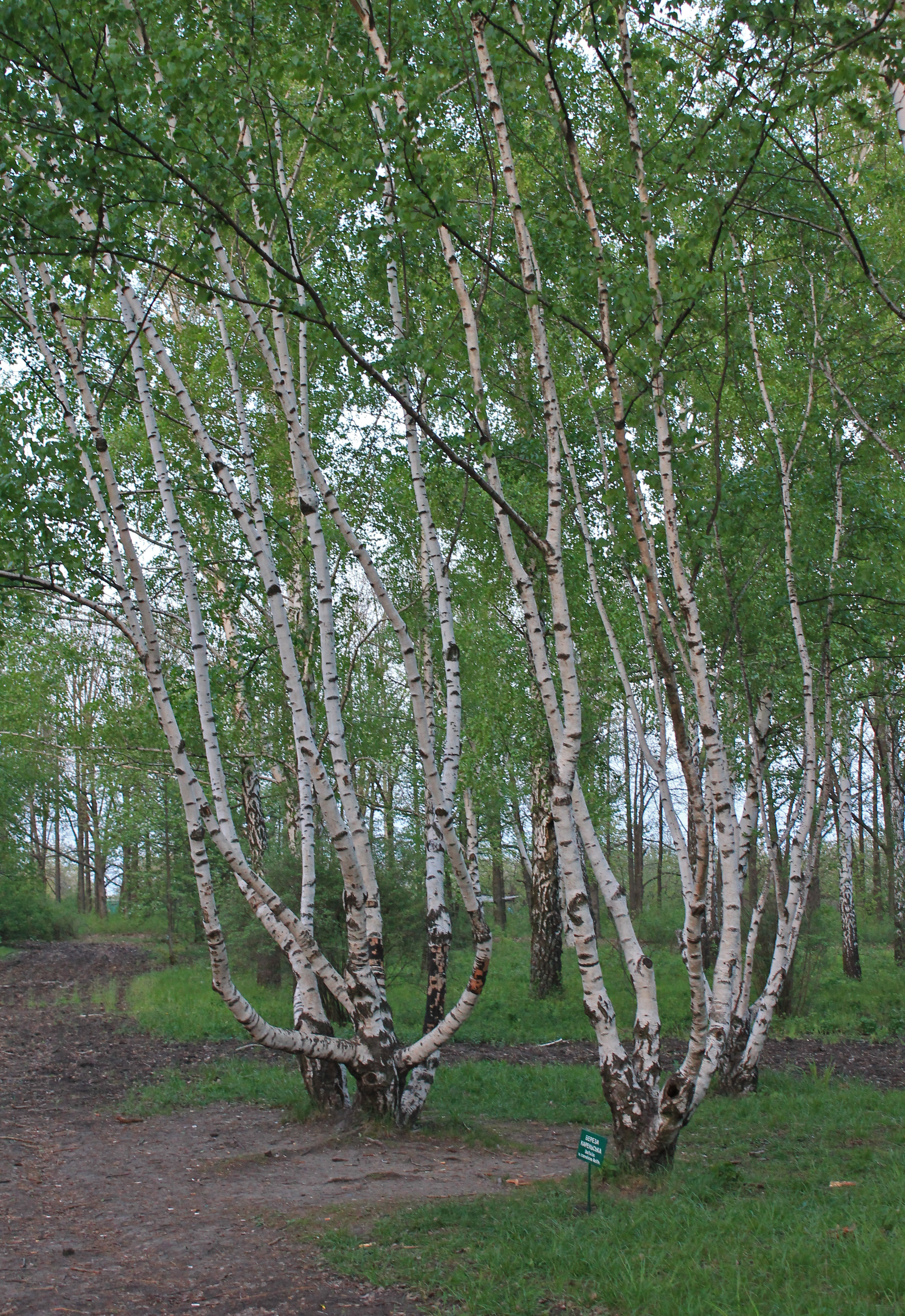
Curly birch

Dendrology park was created on the initiative of the academic staff of the Department of Agroforestry and Forestry. The first trees were planted as the main alley "Scientists Alley" in the spring of 1972.

The university's dendrology park is 23,2 ha parkland area near main building. As well as providing gardens and exotic plants with more than 900 species of shrubs and plants, the park contains an experimental area for investigating evolutionary processes. It is open to the public during daylight hours.

An extensive geography of plants was imported from Europe, the Caucasus, Central Asia, China, the Far East, Japan and North America. Among the plants in the dendrology park, there are such rare species as the Curly birch (Betula pendula var. carelica), Ginkgo (Ginkgo bilŏba), Betula humilis, Taxus baccata and Pinus strobus, listed in the Red Book of Ukraine.

== Institutes and faculties ==
There are six faculties with more than 40 first and second level of full-time and part-time degree courses. The university staff comprises 294 research and academic staff, of whom 34 are professors and 71 - PhDs. It has 386 additional employees in administrative functions.

- Institute for International Education and Advanced Training
- Centre for International Cooperation and Academic Mobility
- Fundamental Library
- Agronomy Faculty
- Plant Protection Faculty
- Forestry Faculty
- Faculty of Land Surveying
- Faculty of Management and Economics
- Faculty of Accounting and Finance
- Post-graduate Education Department
- Pre-educational Department
- Educational and Scientific Production Centre "KhNAU Research Field"
- State Enterprise «Skrypaivske educational and experimental forestry"

== Study and Teaching ==
There are five-cycle degree levels:

1. entry level (pre-university education);
2. the first (bachelor) level;
3. the second (master) level;
4. the third (educational-scientific / educational-creative) PhD level;
5. scientific level (Doctor of Science).

== Scientists and alumni ==
- Dokuchayev Vasyl Vasylovych (1846-1903), geologist, geographer, soil scientist
- Palladin Aleksandr Volodymyrovych (1885-1972), biochemist.
- Lukinov Ivan Ilarionovych (1927-2004), economist.
- Sokolovskyi Oleksii Nykanorovych (1884-1959), soil scientist.
- Georgy Vysotsky (1865-1940), soil scientist, arborist, geobotanist and geographer.
- Yuriev Vasyl Yakovych (1879-1962), plant breeder.
- Strakhov Tymofii Danylovych (1890-1960), mycologist and phytopathologist

== Panorama ==
Kharkiv National Agrarian University named after V.V. Dokuchayev (main facade).

== See also ==
List of universities in Ukraine

== Sources ==
- Kharkiv National Agrarian University named after V.V. Dokuchayev-Official website
- Kharkiv National Agrarian University named after V.V. Dokuchayev-Official website of Vernadsky National Library of Ukraine
