= Aleksandr Palladin =

Biochemist in Soviet Union (1885–1972)

Aleksandr Vladimirovich Palladin (Russian: Алекса́ндр Влади́мирович Палла́дин; Ukrainian: Олександр Володимирович Палладін, 10 September 1885 – 6 December 1972) was a Soviet and Ukrainian biochemist, professor and academician. He is known for establishing the Palladin Institute of Biochemistry and heading the Academy of Sciences of Ukraine in the post World War II period.

Aleksandr was born in a family of the Russian academician and biochemist Vladimir Palladin and was a student of a Russian physiologist Ivan Pavlov.

After graduating Saint Petersburg State University in 1908, next year Palladin also studied at Heidelberg University. After that during 1909–1916 he worked in several institutes in Saint Petersburg. In 1916 Palladin became a professor of Novaya Aleksandria Institute of Agrarian Business and Forestry (today Kharkiv National Agrarian University of Dokuchayev) that was relocated from Puławy in Vistula Land (Congress Poland) to Kharkiv.

Soon after the Red Army recovered the city of Kharkiv from the White Army, in 1921 he became a head of physiological chemistry department of the Kharkiv Medical Institute (today Kharkiv National Medical University) and at the same time staying at the agrarian institute as well for few more years.

== Research ==
His main scientific works were dedicated to the study of the biochemistry of vitamins, muscular activity, biochemistry of the brain and nervous system, metabolism (intracellular carbohydrate and phosphorus exchange), issues of comparative biochemistry of nervous tissue and brain under different functional states. He synthesized an analogue of vitamin K – viсasol, which found wide application in medicine for the treatment of avitaminosis, for accelerating wound healing, and stopping bleeding. He established the biochemical structure of nervous tissue, investigated the characteristics of protein, nucleic acid, and carbohydrate-phosphorus compound metabolism in nervous tissue during excitation and inhibition of the central nervous system using labeled atoms, as well as ion transport processes in nervous system structures.

Preceded by Oleksandr Bohomolets	President of NANU; 1946–1962	Succeeded by Borys Paton
