= Beraba moema =

Scientific classification
- Kingdom: Animalia
- Phylum: Arthropoda
- Class: Insecta
- Order: Coleoptera
- Suborder: Polyphaga
- Infraorder: Cucujiformia
- Family: Cerambycidae
- Genus: Beraba
- Species: B. moema

Binomial name
- Beraba moema Martins, 1997

Species of beetle

Beraba moema is a species of beetle in the family Cerambycidae.
