= Dmytro Zajciw =

Ukrainian and Brazilian entomologist

- Born: 17 February 1897; Velykomykhailivka, Kherson Governorate, Russian Empire
- Died: December 1976 (aged 79); São Paulo, Brazil
- Education: Kharkiv Institute of Public Education
- Scientific career
- Fields: Entomology
- Workplaces: V. Dokuchaev Kharkiv National Agrarian University

Dmytro Zajciw (Ukr. Дмитро Зайців; 17 February 1897 – December 1976) was a Ukrainian and Brazilian entomologist, notable for his many beetle discoveries and for his collection. He was born in Velyka Mykhailivka, Ukraine and died in Rio de Janeiro, Brazil. He was the author of Two new genera and species of neotropical Longhorn beetles (Coleoptera Cerambycidae), 1957, Contribution to the study of Longhorn beetles of Rio de Janeiro (Coleoptera Cerambycidae), 1958, and was the first to describe the genera Adesmoides and Pseudogrammopsis, as well as the species Beraba angusticollis and Mionochroma subaurosum, among many others.

== Early life ==
Zajciw was born on 17 February 1897 in Velykomykhailivka which was part of the Dnipropetrovsk Oblast in the Ukrainian SSR at the time of his birth. From 1926 to 1929 he studied for his postgraduate degree at the Kharkiv Institute of Public Education. While studying in 1928 he was Secretary of the Natural History Section of Kharkiv's Scientific Society, and then after he finished his studies from 1930 to 1941 he was Associate Professor of the Department of Entomology and Zoology of the V. Dokuchaev Kharkiv National Agrarian University where he studied the fauna of beetles in the Soviet Union, particularly in his native region. After the Second World War he emigrated to the West but later resettled in Brazil.

== Personal life ==
Zajciw had a sister named Zaitseva who was born in 1898, she worked in linguistic stylistics, particularly in the Ukrainian language.
