= Aerenicini =

Scientific classification
- Kingdom: Animalia
- Phylum: Arthropoda
- Class: Insecta
- Order: Coleoptera
- Suborder: Polyphaga
- Infraorder: Cucujiformia
- Family: Cerambycidae
- Subfamily: Lamiinae
- Tribe: Aerenicini; Lacordaire, 1872

Tribe of beetles

Aerenicini is a tribe of longhorn beetles of the subfamily Lamiinae.

== Taxonomy ==
The following genera are recognised in the tribe Aerenicini:

- Aerenica Dejean, 1835
- Aerenicella Gilmour, 1962
- Aerenicopsis Bates, 1885
- Aereniphaula Galileo & Martins, 1990
- Aerenomera Gilmour, 1962
- Antodice Thomson, 1864
- Antodilanea Gilmour, 1962
- Aphilesthes Bates, 1881
- Apoaerenica Martins & Galileo, 1985
- Apophaula Lane, 1973
- Cacsius Lane, 1976
- Calliphaula Lane, 1973
- Eponina Lane, 1939
- Holoaerenica Lane, 1973
- Hoplistonychus Melzer, 1930
- Hydraschema Thomson, 1864
- Melzerella Costa Lima, 1931
- Montesia Lane, 1938
- Phaula Thomson, 1857
- Phoebemima Tippmann, 1960
- Propantodice Franz, 1954
- Pseudomecas Aurivillius, 1920
- Pseudophaula Lane, 1973
- Recchia Lane, 1966
- Rumacon Blackwelder, 1946
- Suipinima Martins & Galileo, 2004
- Vianopolisia Lane, 1966
