= A. antiquus =

A. antiquus may refer to:

- Abacetus antiquus, a ground beetle found in India, Myanmar, and Sri Lanka
- Adesmus antiquus, a synonym of Phoebemima antiqua, a longhorn beetle found in Brazil
- Anomalopteryx antiquus, a synonym of Anomalopteryx didiformis, the bush moa, an extinct flightless bird
- Astacus antiquus, a synonym of Protastacus antiquus, a prehistoric decapod
