= Antodice cretata =

Scientific classification
- Kingdom: Animalia
- Phylum: Arthropoda
- Class: Insecta
- Order: Coleoptera
- Suborder: Polyphaga
- Infraorder: Cucujiformia
- Family: Cerambycidae
- Genus: Antodice
- Species: A. cretata

Binomial name
- Antodice cretata Bates, 1872

Species of beetle

Antodice cretata is a species of beetle in the family Cerambycidae. It was described by Henry Walter Bates in 1872.

== Taxonomy ==
The species was described by the English naturalist Henry Walter Bates in 1872. It belongs to the tribe Aerenicini within the subfamily Lamiinae.

== Distribution ==
Antodice cretata is native to Central America. Its recorded range includes Nicaragua, Costa Rica, and Panama.
