= Antodice chemsaki =

Scientific classification
- Kingdom: Animalia
- Phylum: Arthropoda
- Class: Insecta
- Order: Coleoptera
- Suborder: Polyphaga
- Infraorder: Cucujiformia
- Family: Cerambycidae
- Genus: Antodice
- Species: A. chemsaki

Binomial name
- Antodice chemsaki McCarty, 2006

Species of beetle

Antodice chemsaki is a species of beetle in the family Cerambycidae. It was described by McCarty in 2006.

== Taxonomy ==
The species was described by McCarty in 2006. It is classified within the tribe Aerenicini of the subfamily Lamiinae.

== Distribution ==
Antodice chemsaki is native to Mexico, where it has been recorded in the states of Jalisco and Oaxaca.
