= Antodice nympha =

Scientific classification
- Kingdom: Animalia
- Phylum: Arthropoda
- Class: Insecta
- Order: Coleoptera
- Suborder: Polyphaga
- Infraorder: Cucujiformia
- Family: Cerambycidae
- Tribe: Aerenicini
- Genus: Antodice
- Species: A. nympha

Binomial name
- Antodice nympha Bates, 1881

Species of beetle

Antodice nympha is a species of longhorn beetle in the family Cerambycidae. It was described by Henry Walter Bates in 1881.

The species belongs to the tribe Aerenicini within the subfamily Lamiinae. A. nympha is known from Central America, including records from Nicaragua and Panama.
