= Recchia parvula =

Scientific classification
- Kingdom: Animalia
- Phylum: Arthropoda
- Class: Insecta
- Order: Coleoptera
- Suborder: Polyphaga
- Infraorder: Cucujiformia
- Family: Cerambycidae
- Genus: Recchia
- Species: R. parvula

Binomial name
- Recchia parvula (Lane, 1938)

Species of beetle

Recchia parvula is a species of beetle in the family Cerambycidae. It was described by Lane in 1938.
