= Calliphaula filiola =

Scientific classification
- Kingdom: Animalia
- Phylum: Arthropoda
- Class: Insecta
- Order: Coleoptera
- Suborder: Polyphaga
- Infraorder: Cucujiformia
- Family: Cerambycidae
- Genus: Calliphaula
- Species: C. filiola

Binomial name
- Calliphaula filiola Martins, 1984

Species of beetle

Calliphaula filiola is a species of beetle in the family Cerambycidae. It was described by Martins in 1984.
