= Montesia fasciolata =

Scientific classification
- Kingdom: Animalia
- Phylum: Arthropoda
- Class: Insecta
- Order: Coleoptera
- Suborder: Polyphaga
- Infraorder: Cucujiformia
- Family: Cerambycidae
- Genus: Montesia
- Species: M. fasciolata

Binomial name
- Montesia fasciolata Galileo & Martins, 1990

Species of beetle

Montesia fasciolata is a species of beetle in the family Cerambycidae. It was described by Galileo and Martins in 1990.
