= Antodice abstrusa =

Scientific classification
- Kingdom: Animalia
- Phylum: Arthropoda
- Class: Insecta
- Order: Coleoptera
- Suborder: Polyphaga
- Infraorder: Cucujiformia
- Family: Cerambycidae
- Genus: Antodice
- Species: A. abstrusa

Binomial name
- Antodice abstrusa Lane, 1940

Species of beetle

Antodice abstrusa is a species of beetle in the family Cerambycidae. It was described by Lane in 1940.

== Distribution ==
Antodice abstrusa is known to occur in Colombia.
