= Phoebemima theaphia =

Scientific classification
- Domain: Eukaryota
- Kingdom: Animalia
- Phylum: Arthropoda
- Class: Insecta
- Order: Coleoptera
- Suborder: Polyphaga
- Infraorder: Cucujiformia
- Family: Cerambycidae
- Tribe: Hemilophini
- Genus: Phoebemima
- Species: P. theaphia

Binomial name
- Phoebemima theaphia (Bates, 1881)

Synonyms
- Adesmus theaphia Aurivillius, 1923; Amphionycha theaphia Bates, 1881; Hemilophus theaphius Lameere, 1883; Tacocha theaphia Martins & Galileo, 1993

Species of beetle

Phoebemima theaphia is a species of beetle in the family Cerambycidae. It was described by Henry Walter Bates in 1881. It is known from Brazil and Ecuador.
