= Phaula bullula =

Scientific classification
- Domain: Eukaryota
- Kingdom: Animalia
- Phylum: Arthropoda
- Class: Insecta
- Order: Coleoptera
- Suborder: Polyphaga
- Infraorder: Cucujiformia
- Family: Cerambycidae
- Genus: Phaula
- Species: P. bullula

Binomial name
- Phaula bullula Martins, 1984

Species of beetle

Phaula bullula is a species of beetle in the family Cerambycidae. It was described by Martins in 1984.
