= Melzerella monnei =

Scientific classification
- Kingdom: Animalia
- Phylum: Arthropoda
- Class: Insecta
- Order: Coleoptera
- Suborder: Polyphaga
- Infraorder: Cucujiformia
- Family: Cerambycidae
- Genus: Melzerella
- Species: M. monnei

Binomial name
- Melzerella monnei Wappes & Lingafelter, 2011

Species of beetle

Melzerella monnei is a species of beetle in the family Cerambycidae. It was described by Wappes and Lingafelter in 2011.
