= Antodice pinima =

Scientific classification
- Domain: Eukaryota
- Kingdom: Animalia
- Phylum: Arthropoda
- Class: Insecta
- Order: Coleoptera
- Suborder: Polyphaga
- Infraorder: Cucujiformia
- Family: Cerambycidae
- Genus: Antodice
- Species: A. pinima

Binomial name
- Antodice pinima Martins & Galileo, 1998

Species of beetle

Antodice pinima is a species of beetle in the family Cerambycidae. It was described by Martins and Galileo in 1998.
