= Phoebemima teteia =

Scientific classification
- Domain: Eukaryota
- Kingdom: Animalia
- Phylum: Arthropoda
- Class: Insecta
- Order: Coleoptera
- Suborder: Polyphaga
- Infraorder: Cucujiformia
- Family: Cerambycidae
- Tribe: Hemilophini
- Genus: Phoebemima
- Species: P. teteia

Binomial name
- Phoebemima teteia (Galileo & Martins, 1996)

Species of beetle

Phoebemima teteia is a species of beetle in the family Cerambycidae. It was described by Galileo and Martins in 1996. It is known from Brazil.
