= Aerenicopsis =

Scientific classification
- Domain: Eukaryota
- Kingdom: Animalia
- Phylum: Arthropoda
- Class: Insecta
- Order: Coleoptera
- Suborder: Polyphaga
- Infraorder: Cucujiformia
- Family: Cerambycidae
- Tribe: Aerenicini
- Genus: Aerenicopsis

Genus of beetles

Aerenicopsis is a genus of beetles in the family Cerambycidae, containing the following species:

- Aerenicopsis angaibara Martins & Galileo, 2004
- Aerenicopsis championi Bates, 1885
- Aerenicopsis hubrichi Bruch, 1925
- Aerenicopsis irumuara Martins & Galileo, 2004
- Aerenicopsis malleri Lane, 1966
- Aerenicopsis megacephala (Breuning, 1940)
- Aerenicopsis mendosa Martins & Galileo, 1998
- Aerenicopsis perforata Lane, 1939
- Aerenicopsis pugnatrix (Lane, 1966)
- Aerenicopsis rejanae Galileo & Martins, 2007
- Aerenicopsis rufoantennata (Breuning, 1974)
- Aerenicopsis singularis Martins & Galileo, 1998
- Aerenicopsis sublesta Lane, 1966
- Aerenicopsis virgata (Pascoe, 1878)
