= Melzerella costalimai =

Scientific classification
- Kingdom: Animalia
- Phylum: Arthropoda
- Class: Insecta
- Order: Coleoptera
- Suborder: Polyphaga
- Infraorder: Cucujiformia
- Family: Cerambycidae
- Genus: Melzerella
- Species: M. costalimai

Binomial name
- Melzerella costalimai Seabra, 1961

Species of beetle

Melzerella costalimai is a species of beetle in the family Cerambycidae. It was described by Seabra in 1961.
