= Eponina flava =

Scientific classification
- Domain: Eukaryota
- Kingdom: Animalia
- Phylum: Arthropoda
- Class: Insecta
- Order: Coleoptera
- Suborder: Polyphaga
- Infraorder: Cucujiformia
- Family: Cerambycidae
- Genus: Eponina
- Species: E. flava

Binomial name
- Eponina flava Lane, 1939

Species of beetle

Eponina flava is a species of beetle in the family Cerambycidae. It was described by Lane in 1939.
