= Pseudophaula =

Scientific classification
- Kingdom: Animalia
- Phylum: Arthropoda
- Class: Insecta
- Order: Coleoptera
- Suborder: Polyphaga
- Infraorder: Cucujiformia
- Family: Cerambycidae
- Subfamily: Lamiinae
- Tribe: Aerenicini
- Genus: Pseudophaula; Lane, 1973

Genus of beetles

Pseudophaula is a genus of beetles in the family Cerambycidae, containing the following species:

- Pseudophaula foersteri Martins, 1984
- Pseudophaula porosa (Bates, 1881)
- Pseudophaula pustulosa Lane, 1973
- Pseudophaula strigulata Lane, 1973
