= Aerenicopsis virgata =

Scientific classification
- Domain: Eukaryota
- Kingdom: Animalia
- Phylum: Arthropoda
- Class: Insecta
- Order: Coleoptera
- Suborder: Polyphaga
- Infraorder: Cucujiformia
- Family: Cerambycidae
- Genus: Aerenicopsis
- Species: A. virgata

Binomial name
- Aerenicopsis virgata (Pascoe, 1878)

Species of beetle

Aerenicopsis virgata is a species of beetle in the family Cerambycidae. It was described by Francis Polkinghorne Pascoe in 1878.
