= Aerenicella =

Scientific classification
- Domain: Eukaryota
- Kingdom: Animalia
- Phylum: Arthropoda
- Class: Insecta
- Order: Coleoptera
- Suborder: Polyphaga
- Infraorder: Cucujiformia
- Family: Cerambycidae
- Tribe: Aerenicini
- Genus: Aerenicella
- Species: A. spissicornis

Binomial name
- Aerenicella spissicornis (Bates, 1881)

Genus of beetles

Aerenicella is a genus of beetle in the family Cerambycidae. Its only species is Aerenicella spissicornis. It was described by Henry Walter Bates in 1881.
