= Aerenicopsis rufoantennata =

Scientific classification
- Kingdom: Animalia
- Phylum: Arthropoda
- Class: Insecta
- Order: Coleoptera
- Suborder: Polyphaga
- Infraorder: Cucujiformia
- Family: Cerambycidae
- Genus: Aerenicopsis
- Species: A. rufoantennata

Binomial name
- Aerenicopsis rufoantennata (Breuning, 1974)

Species of beetle

Aerenicopsis rufoantennata is a species of beetle in the family Cerambycidae. It was described by Stephan von Breuning in 1974.

== Taxonomy ==
The species was described by the Austrian entomologist Stephan von Breuning in 1974. It was originally placed in the genus Falsohippopsis before being moved to Aerenicopsis.
