= Vianopolisia spitzi =

Scientific classification
- Kingdom: Animalia
- Phylum: Arthropoda
- Class: Insecta
- Order: Coleoptera
- Suborder: Polyphaga
- Infraorder: Cucujiformia
- Family: Cerambycidae
- Genus: Vianopolisia
- Species: V. spitzi

Binomial name
- Vianopolisia spitzi Lane, 1966

Species of beetle

Vianopolisia spitzi is a species of beetle in the family Cerambycidae. It was described by Lane in 1966.
