= Recchia acutipennis =

Scientific classification
- Kingdom: Animalia
- Phylum: Arthropoda
- Class: Insecta
- Order: Coleoptera
- Suborder: Polyphaga
- Infraorder: Cucujiformia
- Family: Cerambycidae
- Genus: Recchia
- Species: R. acutipennis

Binomial name
- Recchia acutipennis Gahan, 1889

Species of beetle

Recchia acutipennis is a species of beetle in the family Cerambycidae. It was described by Gahan in 1889.
