= Pseudophaula foersteri =

Scientific classification
- Kingdom: Animalia
- Phylum: Arthropoda
- Class: Insecta
- Order: Coleoptera
- Suborder: Polyphaga
- Infraorder: Cucujiformia
- Family: Cerambycidae
- Genus: Pseudophaula
- Species: P. foersteri

Binomial name
- Pseudophaula foersteri Martins, 1984

Species of beetle

Pseudophaula foersteri is a species of beetle in the family Cerambycidae. It was described by Martins in 1984.
