= Antodice micromacula =

Scientific classification
- Domain: Eukaryota
- Kingdom: Animalia
- Phylum: Arthropoda
- Class: Insecta
- Order: Coleoptera
- Suborder: Polyphaga
- Infraorder: Cucujiformia
- Family: Cerambycidae
- Genus: Antodice
- Species: A. micromacula

Binomial name
- Antodice micromacula Galileo & Monne, 2008

Species of beetle

Antodice micromacula is a species of beetle in the family Cerambycidae. It was described by Galileo and Monne in 2008.
