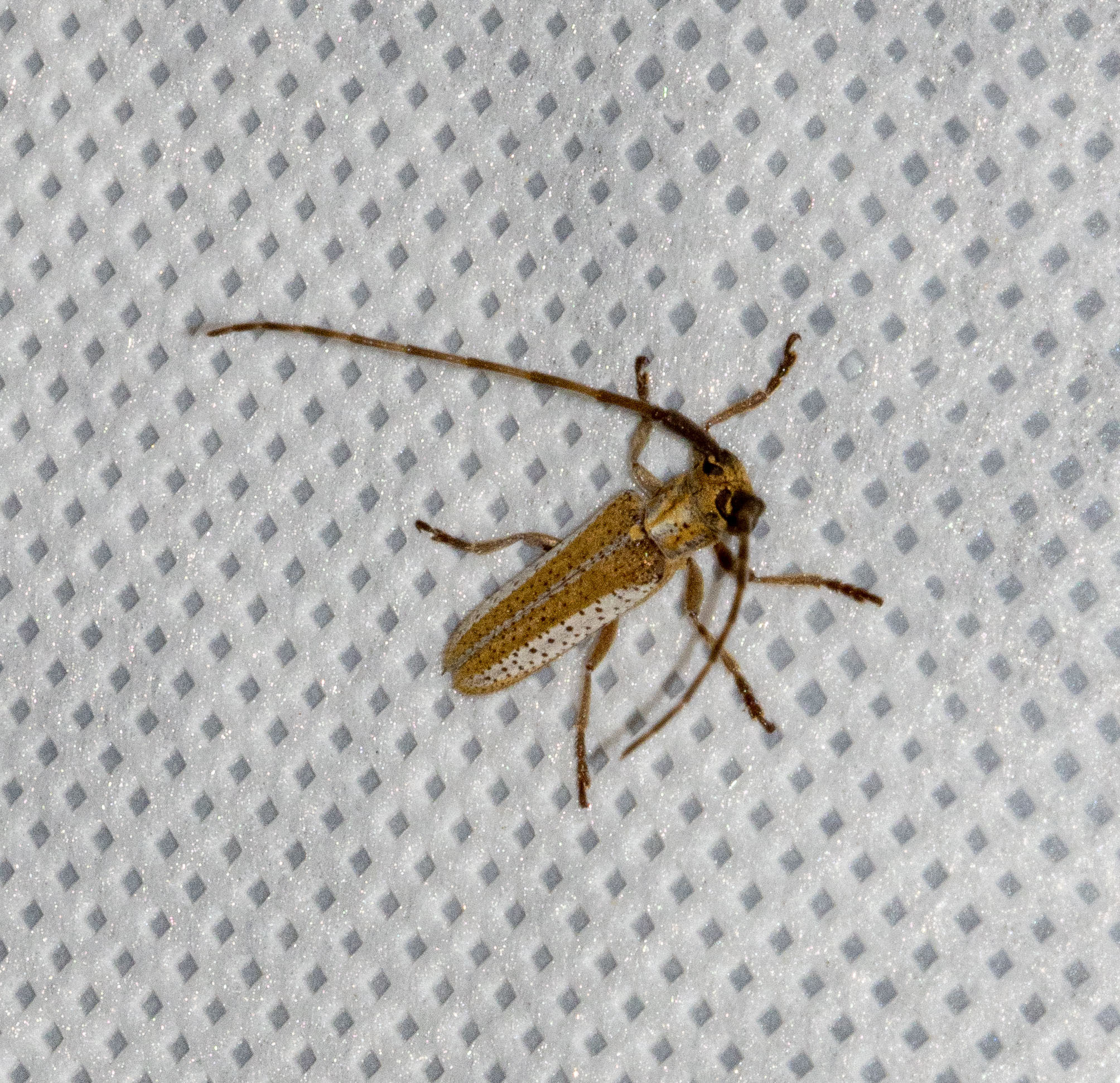
- Holoaerenica multipunctata

Scientific classification
- Kingdom: Animalia
- Phylum: Arthropoda
- Clade: Pancrustacea
- Class: Insecta
- Order: Coleoptera
- Suborder: Polyphaga
- Infraorder: Cucujiformia
- Family: Cerambycidae
- Tribe: Aerenicini
- Genus: Holoaerenica; Lane, 1973

= Holoaerenica =

Genus of beetles

Holoaerenica is a genus of beetles in the family Cerambycidae, containing the following species:

- Holoaerenica alveolata Martins, 1984
- Holoaerenica apleta Galileo & Martins, 1987
- Holoaerenica bistriata Lane, 1973
- Holoaerenica multipunctata (Lepeletier & Aud-Serv in Latreille, 1825)
- Holoaerenica obtusipennis (Fuchs, 1963)
- Holoaerenica punctata (Gilmour, 1962)
