= Melzerella lutzi =

Scientific classification
- Kingdom: Animalia
- Phylum: Arthropoda
- Class: Insecta
- Order: Coleoptera
- Suborder: Polyphaga
- Infraorder: Cucujiformia
- Family: Cerambycidae
- Genus: Melzerella
- Species: M. lutzi

Binomial name
- Melzerella lutzi Costa Lima, 1931

Species of beetle

Melzerella lutzi is a species of beetle in the family Cerambycidae. It was described by Costa Lima in 1931.
