= Eponina =

Scientific classification
- Domain: Eukaryota
- Kingdom: Animalia
- Phylum: Arthropoda
- Class: Insecta
- Order: Coleoptera
- Suborder: Polyphaga
- Infraorder: Cucujiformia
- Family: Cerambycidae
- Tribe: Aerenicini
- Genus: Eponina

Genus of beetles

Eponina is a genus of beetles in the family Cerambycidae, containing the following species:

- Eponina breyeri (Prosen, 1954)
- Eponina flava Lane, 1939
- Eponina lanuginosa (Martins & Galileo, 1985)
- Eponina metuia Martins & Galileo, 1998
- Eponina nigristernis (Martins & Galileo, 1985)
