= Hydraschema =

Scientific classification
- Domain: Eukaryota
- Kingdom: Animalia
- Phylum: Arthropoda
- Class: Insecta
- Order: Coleoptera
- Suborder: Polyphaga
- Infraorder: Cucujiformia
- Family: Cerambycidae
- Subfamily: Lamiinae
- Tribe: Aerenicini
- Genus: Hydraschema; Thomson, 1864

Genus of beetles

Hydraschema is a genus of beetles in the family Cerambycidae, containing the following species:

- Hydraschema cribripennis Lane, 1966
- Hydraschema fabulosa Thomson, 1864
- Hydraschema leptostyla Lane, 1938
- Hydraschema mirim Martins & Galileo, 1998
- Hydraschema obliquevittata (Lane, 1966)
- Hydraschema petila Martins & Galileo, 1998
- Hydraschema veruta Lane, 1966
- Hydraschema villiersi Lane, 1965
