= Holoaerenica alveolata =

Scientific classification
- Domain: Eukaryota
- Kingdom: Animalia
- Phylum: Arthropoda
- Class: Insecta
- Order: Coleoptera
- Suborder: Polyphaga
- Infraorder: Cucujiformia
- Family: Cerambycidae
- Genus: Holoaerenica
- Species: H. alveolata

Binomial name
- Holoaerenica alveolata Martins, 1984

Species of beetle

Holoaerenica alveolata is a species of beetle in the family Cerambycidae. It was described by Martins in 1984.
