= Pseudophaula porosa =

Scientific classification
- Kingdom: Animalia
- Phylum: Arthropoda
- Class: Insecta
- Order: Coleoptera
- Suborder: Polyphaga
- Infraorder: Cucujiformia
- Family: Cerambycidae
- Genus: Pseudophaula
- Species: P. porosa

Binomial name
- Pseudophaula porosa (Bates, 1881)

Species of beetle

Pseudophaula porosa is a species of beetle in the family Cerambycidae. It was described by Bates in 1881.
