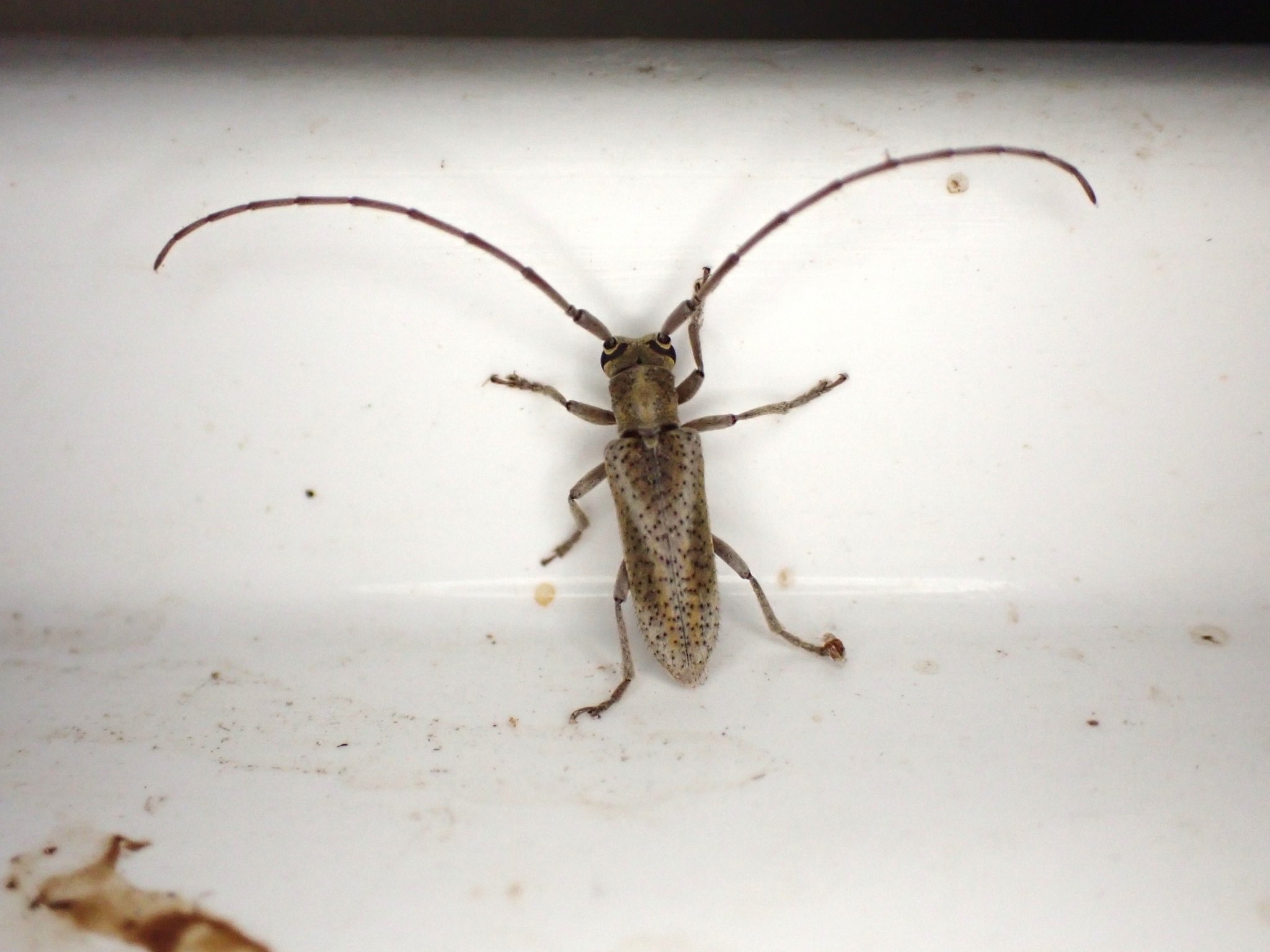
- Aerenomera boliviensis in Bolivia

Scientific classification
- Domain: Eukaryota
- Kingdom: Animalia
- Phylum: Arthropoda
- Class: Insecta
- Order: Coleoptera
- Suborder: Polyphaga
- Infraorder: Cucujiformia
- Family: Cerambycidae
- Genus: Aerenomera
- Species: A. boliviensis

Binomial name
- Aerenomera boliviensis Gilmour, 1962

= Aerenomera boliviensis =

Species of beetle

Aerenomera boliviensis is a species of beetle in the family Cerambycidae. It was described by Gilmour in 1962.
