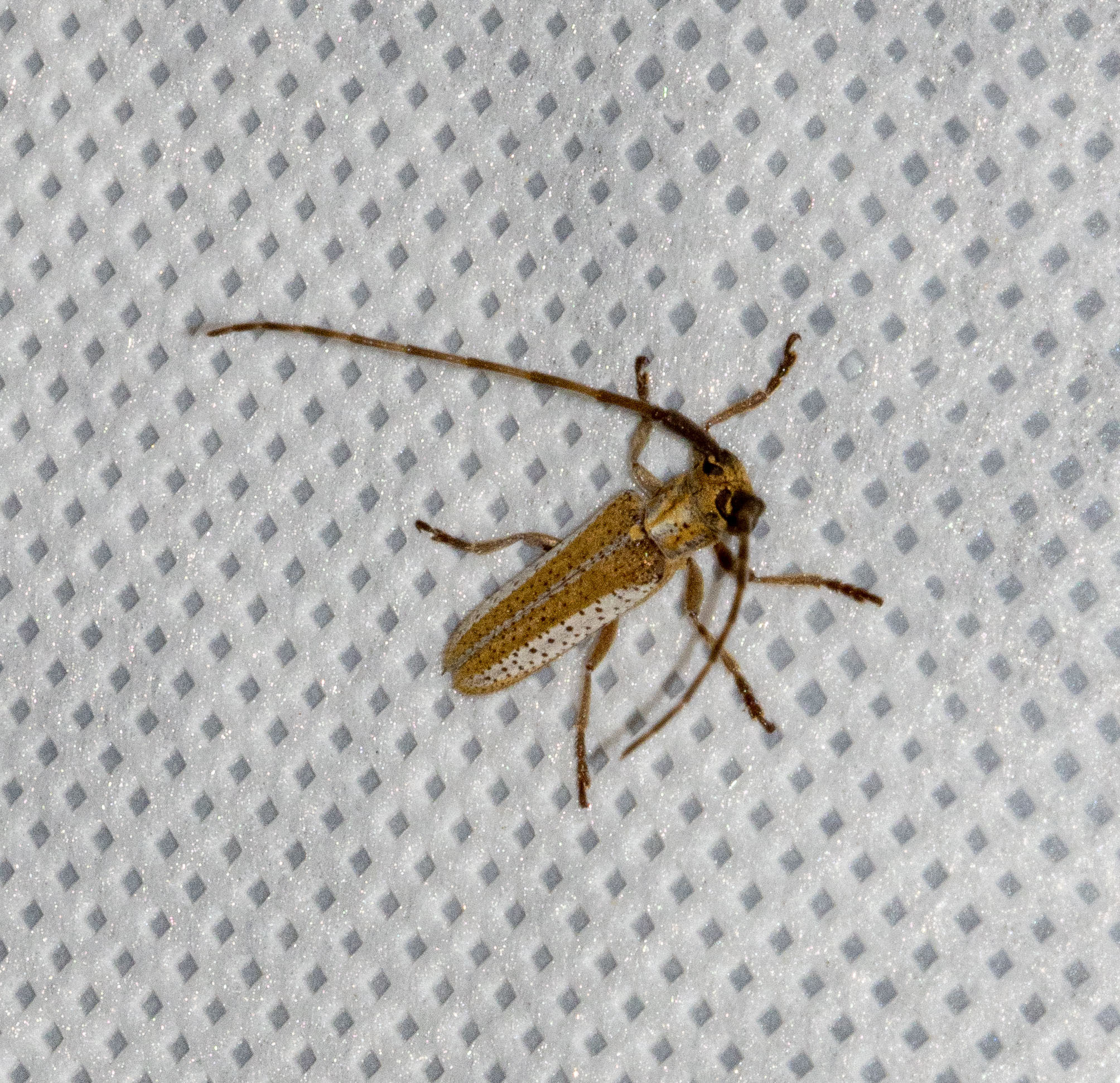

Scientific classification
- Kingdom: Animalia
- Phylum: Arthropoda
- Clade: Pancrustacea
- Class: Insecta
- Order: Coleoptera
- Suborder: Polyphaga
- Infraorder: Cucujiformia
- Family: Cerambycidae
- Genus: Holoaerenica
- Species: H. multipunctata

Binomial name
- Holoaerenica multipunctata (Lepeletier & Audinet-Serville in Latreille, 1825)

= Holoaerenica multipunctata =

Species of beetle

Holoaerenica multipunctata is a species of beetle in the family Cerambycidae. It was first described in 1825 by Amédée Louis Michel Lepeletier and Jean Guillaume Audinet-Serville.
