= Pseudophaula strigulata =

Scientific classification
- Kingdom: Animalia
- Phylum: Arthropoda
- Class: Insecta
- Order: Coleoptera
- Suborder: Polyphaga
- Infraorder: Cucujiformia
- Family: Cerambycidae
- Genus: Pseudophaula
- Species: P. strigulata

Binomial name
- Pseudophaula strigulata Lane, 1973

Species of beetle

Pseudophaula strigulata is a species of beetle in the family Cerambycidae. It was described by Lane in 1973.
