= Recchia gemignanii =

Scientific classification
- Kingdom: Animalia
- Phylum: Arthropoda
- Class: Insecta
- Order: Coleoptera
- Suborder: Polyphaga
- Infraorder: Cucujiformia
- Family: Cerambycidae
- Genus: Recchia
- Species: R. gemignanii

Binomial name
- Recchia gemignanii (Lane, 1939)

Species of beetle

Recchia gemignanii is a species of beetle in the family Cerambycidae. It was described by Lane in 1939.
