= Antodice tricolor =

Scientific classification
- Domain: Eukaryota
- Kingdom: Animalia
- Phylum: Arthropoda
- Class: Insecta
- Order: Coleoptera
- Suborder: Polyphaga
- Infraorder: Cucujiformia
- Family: Cerambycidae
- Genus: Antodice
- Species: A. tricolor

Binomial name
- Antodice tricolor Martins & Galileo, 1985

Species of beetle

Antodice tricolor is a species of beetle in the family Cerambycidae. It was described by Martins and Galileo in 1985.
