= Aerenica =

Scientific classification
- Kingdom: Animalia
- Phylum: Arthropoda
- Class: Insecta
- Order: Coleoptera
- Suborder: Polyphaga
- Infraorder: Cucujiformia
- Family: Cerambycidae
- Tribe: Aerenicini
- Genus: Aerenica; Dejean, 1835
- Species: A. canescens

Binomial name
- Aerenica canescens (Klug, 1825)

Genus of beetles

Aerenica is a monotypic beetle genus in the family Cerambycidae, erected by Pierre François Marie Auguste Dejean in 1835. Its only species, Aerenica canescens, was described by Johann Christoph Friedrich Klug in 1825.
