= Antodice =

Scientific classification
- Domain: Eukaryota
- Kingdom: Animalia
- Phylum: Arthropoda
- Class: Insecta
- Order: Coleoptera
- Suborder: Polyphaga
- Infraorder: Cucujiformia
- Family: Cerambycidae
- Tribe: Aerenicini
- Genus: Antodice

Genus of beetles

Antodice is a genus of beetles in the family Cerambycidae, containing the following species:

- Antodice abstrusa Lane, 1940
- Antodice aureicollis Martins & Galileo, 1985
- Antodice chemsaki McCarty, 2006
- Antodice cretata Bates, 1872
- Antodice eccentrica Galileo & Martins, 1992
- Antodice exilis Chemsak & Noguera, 1993
- Antodice fasciata Linsley, 1935
- Antodice inscripta Lane, 1970
- Antodice juncea Bates, 1881
- Antodice kyra Martins & Galileo, 1998
- Antodice lenticula Martins & Galileo, 1985
- Antodice lezamai McCarty, 2006
- Antodice mendesi Lane, 1940
- Antodice micromacula Galileo & Monne, 2008
- Antodice neivai Lane, 1940
- Antodice nympha Bates, 1881
- Antodice opena Martins & Galileo, 2004
- Antodice picta (Klug, 1825)
- Antodice pinima Martins & Galileo, 1998
- Antodice pudica Lane, 1970
- Antodice quadrimaculata Martins & Galileo, 2003
- Antodice quinquemaculata Lane, 1970
- Antodice sexnotata Franz, 1959
- Antodice spilota Martins & Galileo, 1998
- Antodice suturalis Galileo & Martins, 1992
- Antodice tricolor Martins & Galileo, 1985
- Antodice venustula Lane, 1973
