= Phoebemima albomaculata =

Scientific classification
- Domain: Eukaryota
- Kingdom: Animalia
- Phylum: Arthropoda
- Class: Insecta
- Order: Coleoptera
- Suborder: Polyphaga
- Infraorder: Cucujiformia
- Family: Cerambycidae
- Tribe: Hemilophini
- Genus: Phoebemima
- Species: P. albomaculata

Binomial name
- Phoebemima albomaculata Martins & Galileo, 2008

Species of beetle

Phoebemima albomaculata is a species of beetle in the family Cerambycidae. It was described by Martins and Galileo in 2008. It is known from Bolivia.
