= Holoaerenica obtusipennis =

Scientific classification
- Domain: Eukaryota
- Kingdom: Animalia
- Phylum: Arthropoda
- Class: Insecta
- Order: Coleoptera
- Suborder: Polyphaga
- Infraorder: Cucujiformia
- Family: Cerambycidae
- Genus: Holoaerenica
- Species: H. obtusipennis

Binomial name
- Holoaerenica obtusipennis (E. Fuchs, 1963)

Species of beetle

Holoaerenica obtusipennis is a species of beetle in the family Cerambycidae. It was described by Ernst Fuchs in 1963.
