= Phoebemima aequatoria =

Scientific classification
- Domain: Eukaryota
- Kingdom: Animalia
- Phylum: Arthropoda
- Class: Insecta
- Order: Coleoptera
- Suborder: Polyphaga
- Infraorder: Cucujiformia
- Family: Cerambycidae
- Tribe: Hemilophini
- Genus: Phoebemima
- Species: P. aequatoria

Binomial name
- Phoebemima aequatoria (Lane, 1970)

Synonyms
- Tacocha aequatoria Lane, 1970

Species of beetle

Phoebemima aequatoria is a species of beetle in the family Cerambycidae. It was described by Lane in 1970. It is known from Ecuador.
