= Holoaerenica apleta =

Scientific classification
- Domain: Eukaryota
- Kingdom: Animalia
- Phylum: Arthropoda
- Class: Insecta
- Order: Coleoptera
- Suborder: Polyphaga
- Infraorder: Cucujiformia
- Family: Cerambycidae
- Genus: Holoaerenica
- Species: H. apleta

Binomial name
- Holoaerenica apleta Galileo & Martins, 1987

Species of beetle

Holoaerenica apleta is a species of beetle in the family Cerambycidae. It was described by Galileo and Martins in 1987.
