= Pseudomecas suturalis =

Scientific classification
- Domain: Eukaryota
- Kingdom: Animalia
- Phylum: Arthropoda
- Class: Insecta
- Order: Coleoptera
- Suborder: Polyphaga
- Infraorder: Cucujiformia
- Family: Cerambycidae
- Genus: Pseudomecas
- Species: P. suturalis

Binomial name
- Pseudomecas suturalis Martins & Galileo, 1985

Species of beetle

Pseudomecas suturalis is a species of beetle in the family Cerambycidae. It was described by Martins and Galileo in 1985.
