= Rumacon annulicornis =

Scientific classification
- Kingdom: Animalia
- Phylum: Arthropoda
- Class: Insecta
- Order: Coleoptera
- Suborder: Polyphaga
- Infraorder: Cucujiformia
- Family: Cerambycidae
- Genus: Rumacon
- Species: R. annulicornis

Binomial name
- Rumacon annulicornis (Melzer, 1930)

Species of beetle

Rumacon annulicornis is a species of beetle in the family Cerambycidae. It was described by Melzer in 1930.
