= Cacsius =

Scientific classification
- Domain: Eukaryota
- Kingdom: Animalia
- Phylum: Arthropoda
- Class: Insecta
- Order: Coleoptera
- Suborder: Polyphaga
- Infraorder: Cucujiformia
- Family: Cerambycidae
- Tribe: Aerenicini
- Genus: Cacsius

Genus of beetles

Cacsius is a genus of beetles in the family Cerambycidae, containing the following species:

- Cacsius divus (Melzer, 1932)
- Cacsius nobilis Lane, 1973
