= Phaula =

Scientific classification
- Domain: Eukaryota
- Kingdom: Animalia
- Phylum: Arthropoda
- Class: Insecta
- Order: Coleoptera
- Suborder: Polyphaga
- Infraorder: Cucujiformia
- Family: Cerambycidae
- Tribe: Aerenicini
- Genus: Phaula

Genus of beetles

Phaula is a genus of beetles in the family Cerambycidae, containing the following species:

- Phaula antiqua Thomson, 1857
- Phaula atyroa Galileo & Martins, 2007
- Phaula bullula Martins, 1984
- Phaula lichenigera (Perty, 1832)
- Phaula microsticta (Lane, 1973)
- Phaula splendida (Galileo & Martins, 1987)
- Phaula thomsoni Lacordaire, 1872
