= Recchia fallaciosa =

Scientific classification
- Kingdom: Animalia
- Phylum: Arthropoda
- Class: Insecta
- Order: Coleoptera
- Suborder: Polyphaga
- Infraorder: Cucujiformia
- Family: Cerambycidae
- Genus: Recchia
- Species: R. fallaciosa

Binomial name
- Recchia fallaciosa Lane, 1966

Species of beetle

Recchia fallaciosa is a species of beetle in the family Cerambycidae. It was described by Lane in 1966.
