= Phaula antiqua =

Scientific classification
- Domain: Eukaryota
- Kingdom: Animalia
- Phylum: Arthropoda
- Class: Insecta
- Order: Coleoptera
- Suborder: Polyphaga
- Infraorder: Cucujiformia
- Family: Cerambycidae
- Genus: Phaula
- Species: P. antiqua

Binomial name
- Phaula antiqua Thomson, 1857

Species of beetle

Phaula antiqua is a species of beetle in the family Cerambycidae. It was described by Thomson in 1857.
