= Vianopolisia captiosa =

Scientific classification
- Kingdom: Animalia
- Phylum: Arthropoda
- Class: Insecta
- Order: Coleoptera
- Suborder: Polyphaga
- Infraorder: Cucujiformia
- Family: Cerambycidae
- Genus: Vianopolisia
- Species: V. captiosa

Binomial name
- Vianopolisia captiosa (Martins & Galileo, 1985)

Species of beetle

Vianopolisia captiosa is a species of beetle in the family Cerambycidae. It was described by Martins and Galileo in 1985.
