= Antodice opena =

Scientific classification
- Domain: Eukaryota
- Kingdom: Animalia
- Phylum: Arthropoda
- Class: Insecta
- Order: Coleoptera
- Suborder: Polyphaga
- Infraorder: Cucujiformia
- Family: Cerambycidae
- Genus: Antodice
- Species: A. opena

Binomial name
- Antodice opena Martins & Galileo, 2004

Species of beetle

Antodice opena is a species of beetle in the family Cerambycidae. It was described by Martins and Galileo in 2004.
