= Melzerella huedepohli =

Scientific classification
- Kingdom: Animalia
- Phylum: Arthropoda
- Class: Insecta
- Order: Coleoptera
- Suborder: Polyphaga
- Infraorder: Cucujiformia
- Family: Cerambycidae
- Genus: Melzerella
- Species: M. huedepohli

Binomial name
- Melzerella huedepohli Monné, 1979

Species of beetle

Melzerella huedepohli is a species of beetle in the family Cerambycidae. It was described by Monné in 1979.
