= Hydraschema villiersi =

Scientific classification
- Domain: Eukaryota
- Kingdom: Animalia
- Phylum: Arthropoda
- Class: Insecta
- Order: Coleoptera
- Suborder: Polyphaga
- Infraorder: Cucujiformia
- Family: Cerambycidae
- Genus: Hydraschema
- Species: H. villiersi

Binomial name
- Hydraschema villiersi Lane, 1965

Species of beetle

Hydraschema villiersi is a species of beetle in the family Cerambycidae. It was described by British entomologist John Lane in 1965.
