= Montesia elegantula =

Scientific classification
- Kingdom: Animalia
- Phylum: Arthropoda
- Class: Insecta
- Order: Coleoptera
- Suborder: Polyphaga
- Infraorder: Cucujiformia
- Family: Cerambycidae
- Genus: Montesia
- Species: M. elegantula

Binomial name
- Montesia elegantula Monné, 1979

Species of beetle

Montesia elegantula is a species of beetle in the family Cerambycidae. It was described by Monné in 1979.
