= Recchia lanei =

Scientific classification
- Kingdom: Animalia
- Phylum: Arthropoda
- Class: Insecta
- Order: Coleoptera
- Suborder: Polyphaga
- Infraorder: Cucujiformia
- Family: Cerambycidae
- Genus: Recchia
- Species: R. lanei

Binomial name
- Recchia lanei Martins & Galileo, 1985

Species of beetle

Recchia lanei is a species of beetle in the family Cerambycidae. It was described by Martins and Galileo in 1985.
