= Pseudomecas pallidicornis =

Scientific classification
- Domain: Eukaryota
- Kingdom: Animalia
- Phylum: Arthropoda
- Class: Insecta
- Order: Coleoptera
- Suborder: Polyphaga
- Infraorder: Cucujiformia
- Family: Cerambycidae
- Genus: Pseudomecas
- Species: P. pallidicornis

Binomial name
- Pseudomecas pallidicornis Aurivillius, 1923

Species of beetle

Pseudomecas pallidicornis is a species of beetle in the family Cerambycidae. It was described by Per Olof Christopher Aurivillius in 1923.
