= Antodice eccentrica =

Scientific classification
- Kingdom: Animalia
- Phylum: Arthropoda
- Class: Insecta
- Order: Coleoptera
- Suborder: Polyphaga
- Infraorder: Cucujiformia
- Family: Cerambycidae
- Genus: Antodice
- Species: A. eccentrica

Binomial name
- Antodice eccentrica Galileo & Martins, 1992

Species of beetle

Antodice eccentrica is a species of beetle in the family Cerambycidae with long antennae, large compound eyes, and wings. It was described by Galileo and Martins in 1992.

== Distribution ==
Antodice eccentrica is found in Ecuador.
