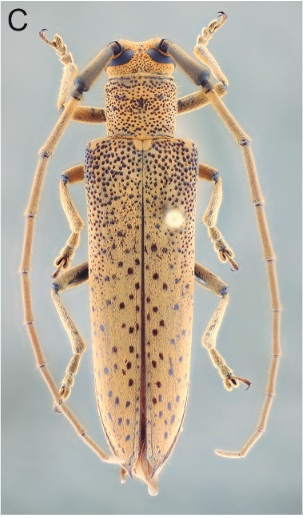

Scientific classification
- Kingdom: Animalia
- Phylum: Arthropoda
- Clade: Pancrustacea
- Class: Insecta
- Order: Coleoptera
- Suborder: Polyphaga
- Infraorder: Cucujiformia
- Family: Cerambycidae
- Genus: Phaula
- Species: P. thomsoni

Binomial name
- Phaula thomsoni Lacordaire, 1872

Synonyms
- Ochraesius sticticus Pascoe, 1888

= Phaula thomsoni =

Species of beetle

Phaula thomsoni is a species of beetle in the family Cerambycidae. It was described by Lacordaire in 1872. It is found in Bolivia, Brazil (Pará, Mato Grosso do Sul, Goiás, Maranhão, Bahia, Minas Gerais, Espirito Santo, Rio de Janeiro, São Paulo, Paraná, Santa Catarina, Rio Grande do Sul), Paraguay and Argentina.
