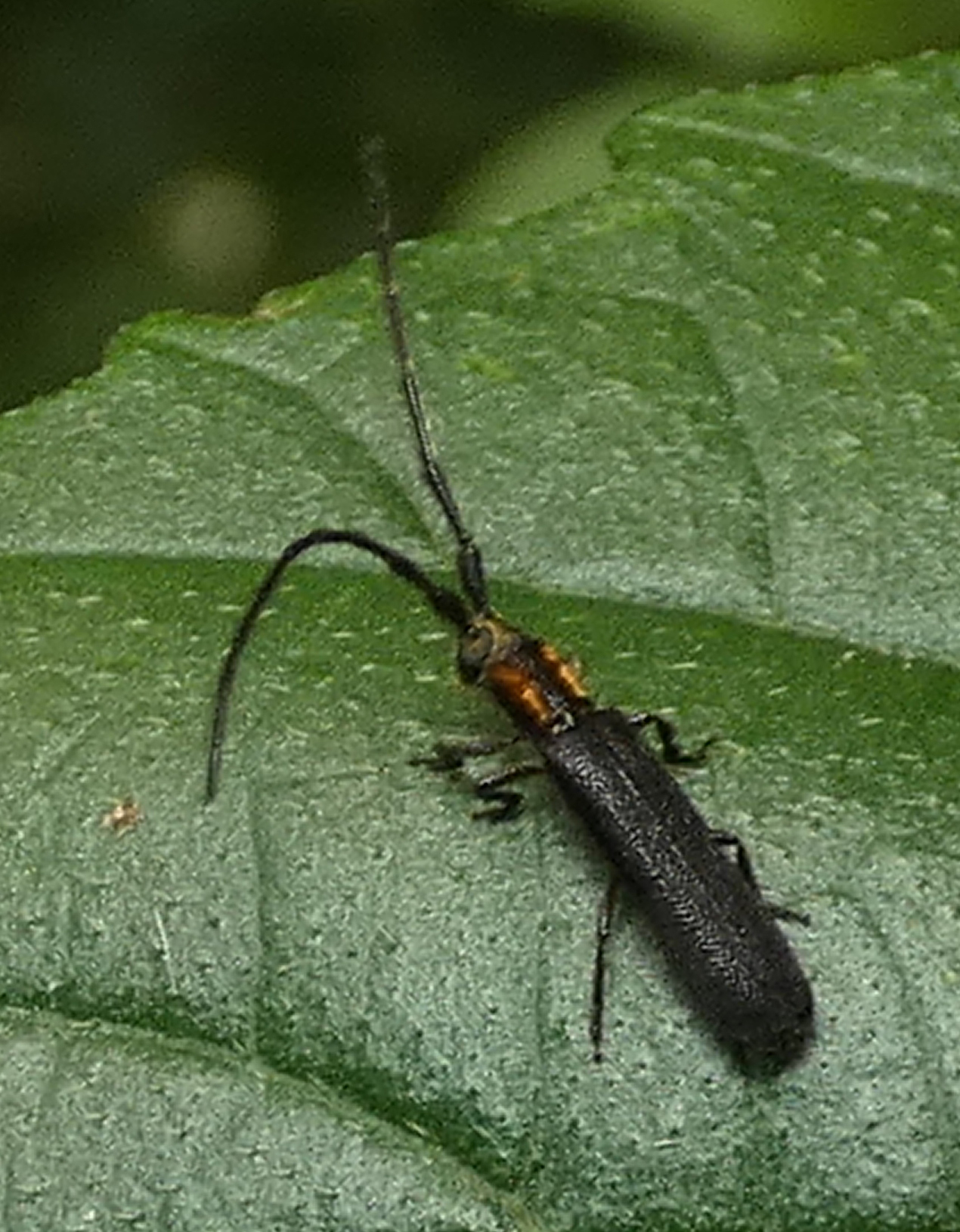

Scientific classification
- Kingdom: Animalia
- Phylum: Arthropoda
- Class: Insecta
- Order: Coleoptera
- Suborder: Polyphaga
- Infraorder: Cucujiformia
- Family: Cerambycidae
- Genus: Antodice
- Species: A. aureicollis

Binomial name
- Antodice aureicollis Martins & Galileo, 1985

= Antodice aureicollis =

Species of beetle

Antodice aureicollis is a species of beetle in the family Cerambycidae. It was described by Martins and Galileo in 1985.

== Distribution ==
Antodice aureicollis is known to occur in Brazil, specifically in the state of Espírito Santo.
