= Antodice fasciata =

Scientific classification
- Domain: Eukaryota
- Kingdom: Animalia
- Phylum: Arthropoda
- Class: Insecta
- Order: Coleoptera
- Suborder: Polyphaga
- Infraorder: Cucujiformia
- Family: Cerambycidae
- Genus: Antodice
- Species: A. fasciata

Binomial name
- Antodice fasciata Linsley, 1935

Species of beetle

Antodice fasciata is a species of beetle in the family Cerambycidae. It was described by Linsley in 1935.
