= Aerenomera spilas =

Scientific classification
- Domain: Eukaryota
- Kingdom: Animalia
- Phylum: Arthropoda
- Class: Insecta
- Order: Coleoptera
- Suborder: Polyphaga
- Infraorder: Cucujiformia
- Family: Cerambycidae
- Genus: Aerenomera
- Species: A. spilas

Binomial name
- Aerenomera spilas Martins, 1984

Species of beetle

Aerenomera spilas is a species of beetle in the family Cerambycidae. It was described by Martins in 1984.
