= Antodilanea modesta =

Scientific classification
- Domain: Eukaryota
- Kingdom: Animalia
- Phylum: Arthropoda
- Class: Insecta
- Order: Coleoptera
- Suborder: Polyphaga
- Infraorder: Cucujiformia
- Family: Cerambycidae
- Genus: Antodilanea
- Species: A. modesta

Binomial name
- Antodilanea modesta (Lane, 1939)

Species of beetle

Antodilanea modesta is a species of beetle in the family Cerambycidae. It was described by Lane in 1939.
