= Antodice picta =

Scientific classification
- Kingdom: Animalia
- Phylum: Arthropoda
- Clade: Pancrustacea
- Class: Insecta
- Order: Coleoptera
- Suborder: Polyphaga
- Infraorder: Cucujiformia
- Family: Cerambycidae
- Genus: Antodice
- Species: A. picta

Binomial name
- Antodice picta (Klug, 1825)

Species of beetle

Antodice picta is a species of beetle in the family Cerambycidae. It was described by Johann Christoph Friedrich Klug in 1825. It is found in Brazil (Paraíba, Bahia, Minas Gerais, Espírito Santo, Rio de Janeiro, São Paulo, Paraná, Santa Catarina, Rio Grande do Sul), Paraguay and Argentina (Misiones).
