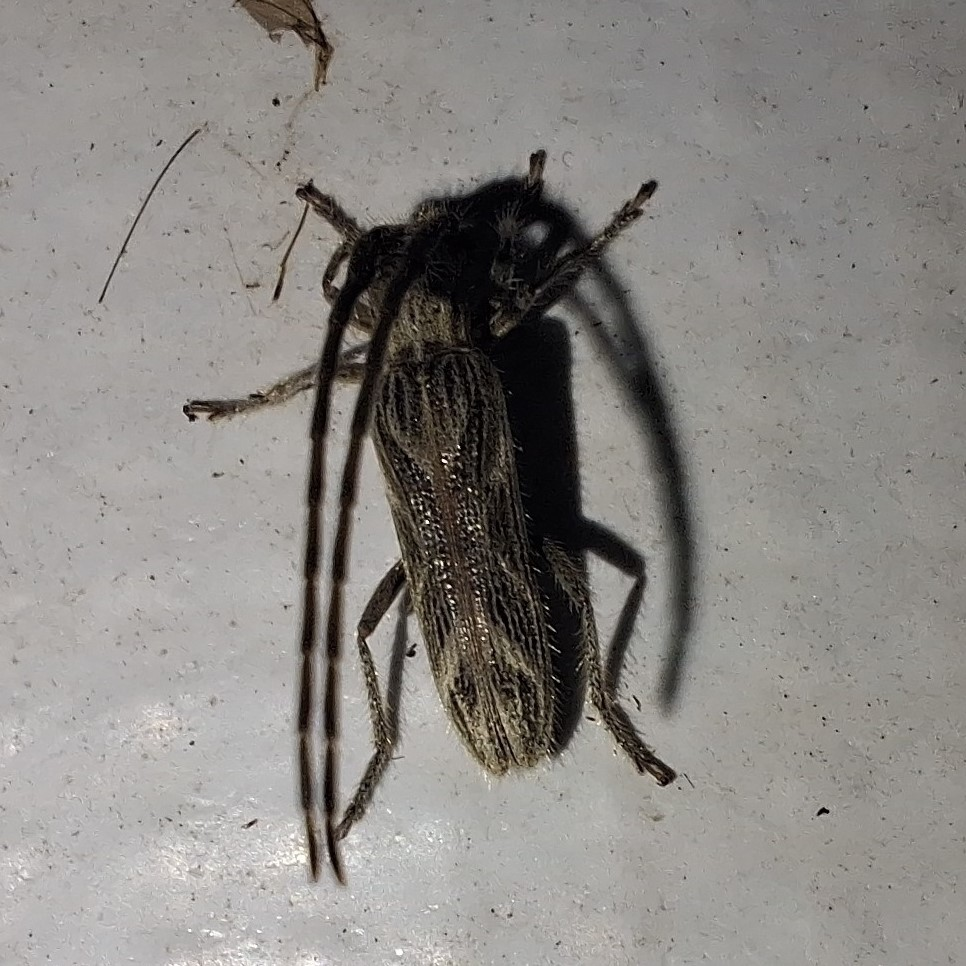

Scientific classification
- Kingdom: Animalia
- Phylum: Arthropoda
- Class: Insecta
- Order: Coleoptera
- Suborder: Polyphaga
- Infraorder: Cucujiformia
- Family: Cerambycidae
- Genus: Recchia
- Species: R. hirsuta

Binomial name
- Recchia hirsuta (Bates, 1881)

= Recchia hirsuta =

Species of beetle

Recchia hirsuta is a species of beetle in the family Cerambycidae. It was described by Henry Walter Bates in 1881.
