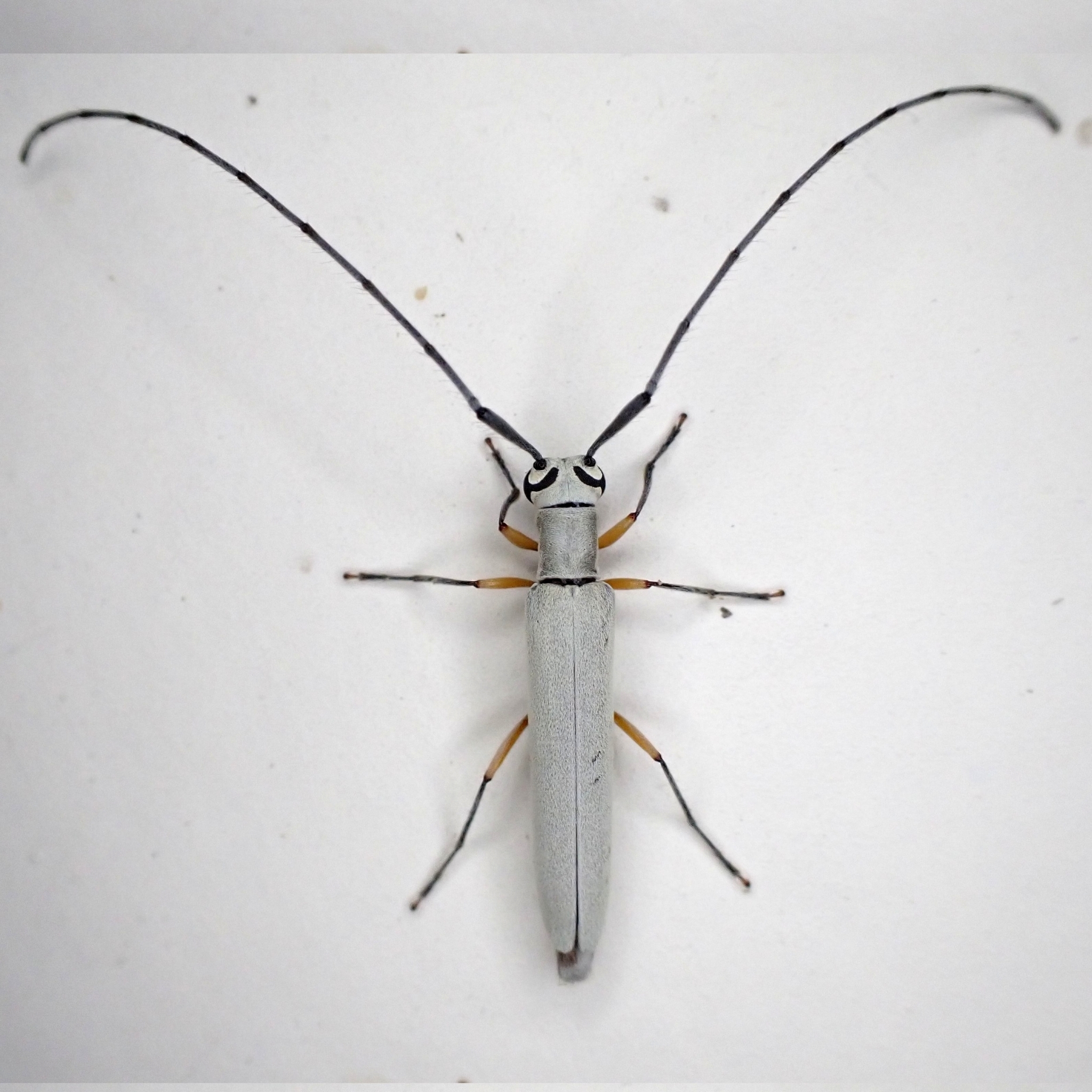

Scientific classification
- Kingdom: Animalia
- Phylum: Arthropoda
- Class: Insecta
- Order: Coleoptera
- Suborder: Polyphaga
- Infraorder: Cucujiformia
- Family: Cerambycidae
- Genus: Pseudomecas
- Species: P. femoralis

Binomial name
- Pseudomecas femoralis Aurivillius, 1920

= Pseudomecas femoralis =

Species of beetle

Pseudomecas femoralis is a species of beetle in the family Cerambycidae. It was described by Per Olof Christopher Aurivillius in 1920.
