= Antodilanea =

Scientific classification
- Domain: Eukaryota
- Kingdom: Animalia
- Phylum: Arthropoda
- Class: Insecta
- Order: Coleoptera
- Suborder: Polyphaga
- Infraorder: Cucujiformia
- Family: Cerambycidae
- Tribe: Aerenicini
- Genus: Antodilanea

Genus of beetles

Antodilanea is a genus of beetles in the family Cerambycidae, containing the following species:

- Antodilanea auana Martins & Galileo, 2004
- Antodilanea modesta (Lane, 1939)
