= Vianopolisia =

Scientific classification
- Kingdom: Animalia
- Phylum: Arthropoda
- Class: Insecta
- Order: Coleoptera
- Suborder: Polyphaga
- Infraorder: Cucujiformia
- Family: Cerambycidae
- Subfamily: Lamiinae
- Tribe: Aerenicini
- Genus: Vianopolisia; Lane, 1966

Genus of beetles

Vianopolisia is a genus of beetles in the family Cerambycidae, containing the following species:

- Vianopolisia captiosa (Martins & Galileo, 1985)
- Vianopolisia spitzi Lane, 1966
