= Montesia =

Scientific classification
- Kingdom: Animalia
- Phylum: Arthropoda
- Class: Insecta
- Order: Coleoptera
- Suborder: Polyphaga
- Infraorder: Cucujiformia
- Family: Cerambycidae
- Subfamily: Lamiinae
- Tribe: Aerenicini
- Genus: Montesia; Lane, 1938

Genus of beetles

Montesia is a genus of beetles in the family Cerambycidae, containing the following species:

- Montesia bosqi Seabra, 1961
- Montesia elegantula Monné, 1979
- Montesia fasciolata Galileo & Martins, 1990
- Montesia leucostigma Lane, 1938
