= Phoebemima ensifera =

Scientific classification
- Domain: Eukaryota
- Kingdom: Animalia
- Phylum: Arthropoda
- Class: Insecta
- Order: Coleoptera
- Suborder: Polyphaga
- Infraorder: Cucujiformia
- Family: Cerambycidae
- Tribe: Hemilophini
- Genus: Phoebemima
- Species: P. ensifera

Binomial name
- Phoebemima ensifera Tippmann, 1960

Species of beetle

Phoebemima ensifera is a species of beetle in the family Cerambycidae. It was described by Tippmann in 1960. It is known from Bolivia.
