= Aerenicopsis sublesta =

Scientific classification
- Domain: Eukaryota
- Kingdom: Animalia
- Phylum: Arthropoda
- Class: Insecta
- Order: Coleoptera
- Suborder: Polyphaga
- Infraorder: Cucujiformia
- Family: Cerambycidae
- Genus: Aerenicopsis
- Species: A. sublesta

Binomial name
- Aerenicopsis sublesta Lane, 1966

Species of beetle

Aerenicopsis sublesta is a species of beetle in the family Cerambycidae. It was described by Lane in 1966.
