= Cacsius nobilis =

Scientific classification
- Domain: Eukaryota
- Kingdom: Animalia
- Phylum: Arthropoda
- Class: Insecta
- Order: Coleoptera
- Suborder: Polyphaga
- Infraorder: Cucujiformia
- Family: Cerambycidae
- Genus: Cacsius
- Species: C. nobilis

Binomial name
- Cacsius nobilis Lane, 1973

Species of beetle

Cacsius nobilis is a species of beetle in the family Cerambycidae. It was described by Lane in 1973.
