= Calliphaula =

Scientific classification
- Kingdom: Animalia
- Phylum: Arthropoda
- Class: Insecta
- Order: Coleoptera
- Suborder: Polyphaga
- Infraorder: Cucujiformia
- Family: Cerambycidae
- Subfamily: Lamiinae
- Tribe: Aerenicini
- Genus: Calliphaula; Lane, 1973

Genus of beetles

Calliphaula is a genus of beetles in the family Cerambycidae, containing the following species:

- Calliphaula filiola Martins, 1984
- Calliphaula leucippe (Bates, 1881)
