= Antodice juncea =

Scientific classification
- Domain: Eukaryota
- Kingdom: Animalia
- Phylum: Arthropoda
- Class: Insecta
- Order: Coleoptera
- Suborder: Polyphaga
- Infraorder: Cucujiformia
- Family: Cerambycidae
- Genus: Antodice
- Species: A. juncea

Binomial name
- Antodice juncea Bates, 1881

Species of beetle

Antodice juncea is a species of beetle in the family Cerambycidae. It was described by Henry Walter Bates in 1881.
