= Recchia hirticornis =

Scientific classification
- Kingdom: Animalia
- Phylum: Arthropoda
- Class: Insecta
- Order: Coleoptera
- Suborder: Polyphaga
- Infraorder: Cucujiformia
- Family: Cerambycidae
- Genus: Recchia
- Species: R. hirticornis

Binomial name
- Recchia hirticornis (Klug, 1825)

Species of beetle

Recchia hirticornis is a species of beetle in the family Cerambycidae. It was described by Johann Christoph Friedrich Klug in 1825.
