= Eponina breyeri =

Scientific classification
- Domain: Eukaryota
- Kingdom: Animalia
- Phylum: Arthropoda
- Class: Insecta
- Order: Coleoptera
- Suborder: Polyphaga
- Infraorder: Cucujiformia
- Family: Cerambycidae
- Genus: Eponina
- Species: E. breyeri

Binomial name
- Eponina breyeri (Prosen, 1954)

Species of beetle

Eponina breyeri is a species of beetle in the family Cerambycidae. It was described by Prosen in 1954.
