= Antodice sexnotata =

Scientific classification
- Domain: Eukaryota
- Kingdom: Animalia
- Phylum: Arthropoda
- Class: Insecta
- Order: Coleoptera
- Suborder: Polyphaga
- Infraorder: Cucujiformia
- Family: Cerambycidae
- Genus: Antodice
- Species: A. sexnotata

Binomial name
- Antodice sexnotata Franz, 1959

Species of beetle

Antodice sexnotata is a species of beetle in the family Cerambycidae. It was described by Franz in 1959.
