= Phoebemima =

Scientific classification
- Domain: Eukaryota
- Kingdom: Animalia
- Phylum: Arthropoda
- Class: Insecta
- Order: Coleoptera
- Suborder: Polyphaga
- Infraorder: Cucujiformia
- Family: Cerambycidae
- Tribe: Aerenicini
- Genus: Phoebemima; Tippmann, 1960

Synonyms
- Tacocha Lane, 1970

Genus of beetles

Phoebemima is a genus of longhorn beetles of the subfamily Lamiinae, containing the following species:

- Phoebemima aequatoria (Lane, 1970)
- Phoebemima albomaculata Martins & Galileo, 2008
- Phoebemima antiqua (Gahan, 1889)
- Phoebemima durantoni Tavakilian & Santos-Silva, 2019
- Phoebemima ensifera Tippmann, 1960
- Phoebemima teteia (Galileo & Martins, 1996)
- Phoebemima theaphia (Bates, 1881)
