= Phaula splendida =

Scientific classification
- Domain: Eukaryota
- Kingdom: Animalia
- Phylum: Arthropoda
- Class: Insecta
- Order: Coleoptera
- Suborder: Polyphaga
- Infraorder: Cucujiformia
- Family: Cerambycidae
- Genus: Phaula
- Species: P. splendida

Binomial name
- Phaula splendida (Galileo & Martins, 1987)

Species of beetle

Phaula splendida is a species of beetle in the family Cerambycidae. It was described by Galileo and Martins in 1987.
