= Recchia piriana =

Scientific classification
- Kingdom: Animalia
- Phylum: Arthropoda
- Class: Insecta
- Order: Coleoptera
- Suborder: Polyphaga
- Infraorder: Cucujiformia
- Family: Cerambycidae
- Genus: Recchia
- Species: R. piriana

Binomial name
- Recchia piriana Martins & Galileo, 1998

Species of beetle

Recchia piriana is a species of beetle in the family Cerambycidae. It was described by Martins and Galileo in 1998.
