= Melzerella =

Scientific classification
- Kingdom: Animalia
- Phylum: Arthropoda
- Class: Insecta
- Order: Coleoptera
- Suborder: Polyphaga
- Infraorder: Cucujiformia
- Family: Cerambycidae
- Subfamily: Lamiinae
- Tribe: Aerenicini
- Genus: Melzerella; Costa Lima, 1931

Genus of beetles

Melzerella is a genus of beetles in the family Cerambycidae, containing the following species:

- Melzerella costalimai Seabra, 1961
- Melzerella huedepohli Monné, 1979
- Melzerella lutzi Costa Lima, 1931
- Melzerella monnei Wappes & Lingafelter, 2011
