= Recchia albicans =

Scientific classification
- Kingdom: Animalia
- Phylum: Arthropoda
- Clade: Pancrustacea
- Class: Insecta
- Order: Coleoptera
- Suborder: Polyphaga
- Infraorder: Cucujiformia
- Family: Cerambycidae
- Genus: Recchia
- Species: R. albicans

Binomial name
- Recchia albicans (Guérin-Méneville, 1831)

Species of beetle

Recchia albicans is a species of beetle in the family Cerambycidae. It was described by Félix Édouard Guérin-Méneville in 1831.
