= Montesia bosqi =

Scientific classification
- Kingdom: Animalia
- Phylum: Arthropoda
- Class: Insecta
- Order: Coleoptera
- Suborder: Polyphaga
- Infraorder: Cucujiformia
- Family: Cerambycidae
- Genus: Montesia
- Species: M. bosqi

Binomial name
- Montesia bosqi Seabra, 1961

Species of beetle

Montesia bosqi is a species of beetle in the family Cerambycidae. It was described by Seabra in 1961.
