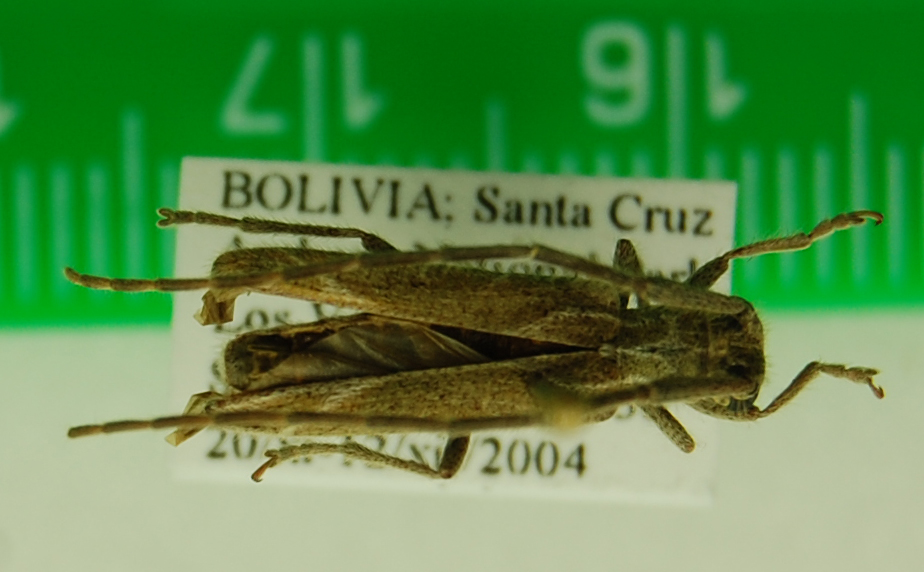
- Recchia distincta

Scientific classification
- Kingdom: Animalia
- Phylum: Arthropoda
- Class: Insecta
- Order: Coleoptera
- Suborder: Polyphaga
- Infraorder: Cucujiformia
- Family: Cerambycidae
- Subfamily: Lamiinae
- Tribe: Aerenicini
- Genus: Recchia; Lane, 1966

= Recchia (beetle) =

Genus of beetles

Recchia is a genus of beetles in the family Cerambycidae, containing the following species:

- Recchia abauna Martins & Galileo, 1998
- Recchia acutipennis Gahan, 1889
- Recchia albicans (Guérin-Méneville, 1831)
- Recchia boliviana Martins & Galileo, 1998
- Recchia distincta (Lane, 1939)
- Recchia fallaciosa Lane, 1966
- Recchia flaveola Martins & Galileo, 1985
- Recchia fonsecai (Lane, 1939)
- Recchia gemignanii (Lane, 1939)
- Recchia goiana Martins & Galileo, 1985
- Recchia gracilis Martins & Galileo, 1985
- Recchia hirsuta (Bates, 1881)
- Recchia hirticornis (Klug, 1825)
- Recchia lanei Martins & Galileo, 1985
- Recchia ludibriosa Lane, 1966
- Recchia moema Martins & Galileo, 1998
- Recchia parvula (Lane, 1938)
- Recchia piriana Martins & Galileo, 1998
- Recchia planaltina Martins & Galileo, 1998
- Recchia procera Martins & Galileo, 1985
- Recchia ravida Martins & Galileo, 1985
- Recchia veruta Lane, 1966
