= Recchia ravida =

Scientific classification
- Kingdom: Animalia
- Phylum: Arthropoda
- Class: Insecta
- Order: Coleoptera
- Suborder: Polyphaga
- Infraorder: Cucujiformia
- Family: Cerambycidae
- Genus: Recchia
- Species: R. ravida

Binomial name
- Recchia ravida Martins & Galileo, 1985

Species of beetle

Recchia ravida is a species of beetle in the family Cerambycidae. It was documented by Martins and Galileo in 1985.
