= Holoaerenica punctata =

Scientific classification
- Domain: Eukaryota
- Kingdom: Animalia
- Phylum: Arthropoda
- Class: Insecta
- Order: Coleoptera
- Suborder: Polyphaga
- Infraorder: Cucujiformia
- Family: Cerambycidae
- Genus: Holoaerenica
- Species: H. punctata

Binomial name
- Holoaerenica punctata (Gilmour, 1962)

Species of beetle

Holoaerenica punctata is a species of beetle in the family Cerambycidae. It was described by Gilmour in 1962.
