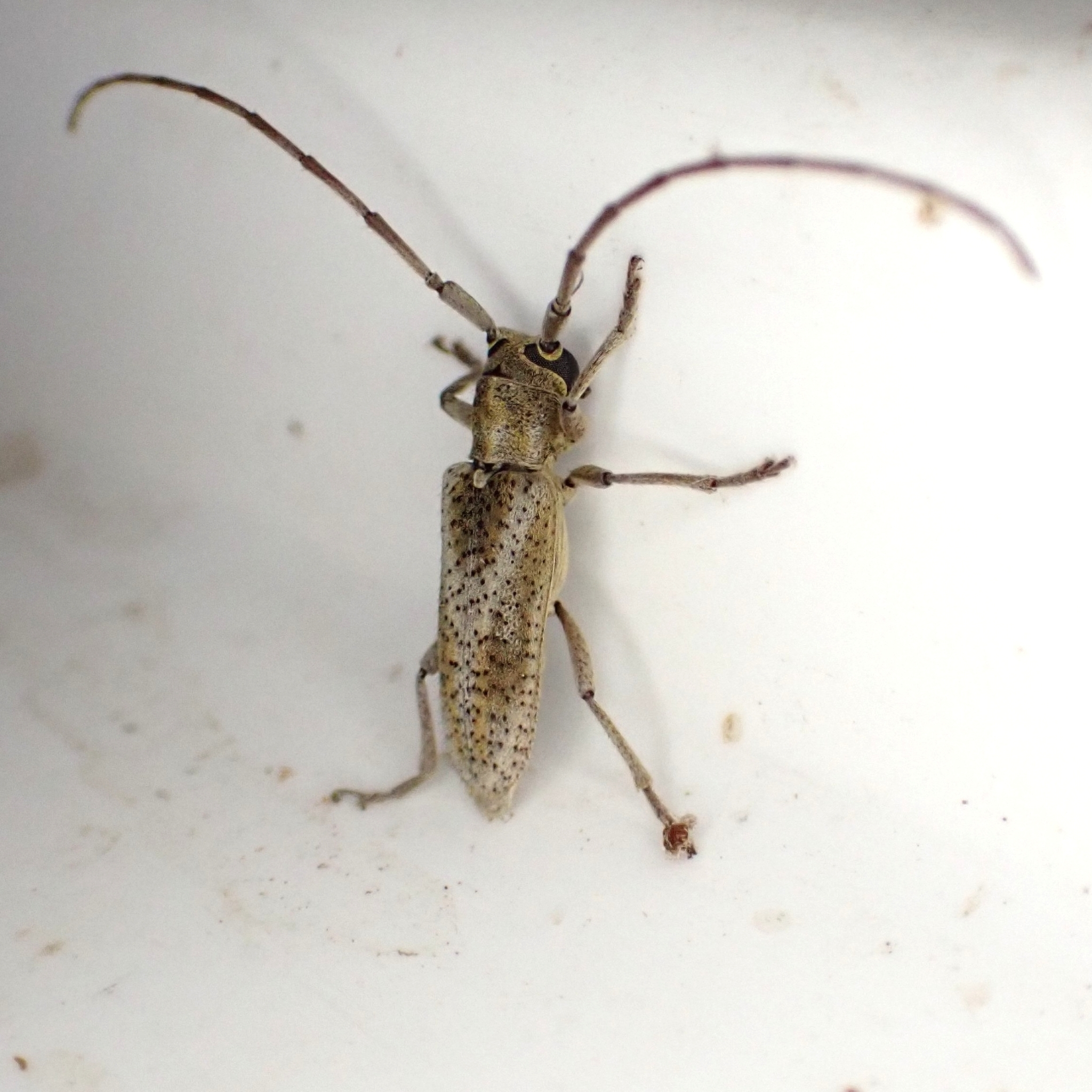

Scientific classification
- Kingdom: Animalia
- Phylum: Arthropoda
- Class: Insecta
- Order: Coleoptera
- Suborder: Polyphaga
- Infraorder: Cucujiformia
- Family: Cerambycidae
- Tribe: Aerenicini
- Genus: Aerenomera

= Aerenomera =

Genus of beetles

Aerenomera is a genus of beetles in the family Cerambycidae, containing the following species:

- Aerenomera boliviensis Gilmour, 1962
- Aerenomera spilas Martins, 1984
