= Rumacon canescens =

Scientific classification
- Domain: Eukaryota
- Kingdom: Animalia
- Phylum: Arthropoda
- Class: Insecta
- Order: Coleoptera
- Suborder: Polyphaga
- Infraorder: Cucujiformia
- Family: Cerambycidae
- Genus: Rumacon
- Species: R. canescens

Binomial name
- Rumacon canescens (Bruch, 1926)

Species of beetle

Rumacon canescens is a species of beetle in the family Cerambycidae. It was described by Bruch in 1926.
