= Pseudomecas pickeli =

Scientific classification
- Kingdom: Animalia
- Phylum: Arthropoda
- Class: Insecta
- Order: Coleoptera
- Suborder: Polyphaga
- Infraorder: Cucujiformia
- Family: Cerambycidae
- Genus: Pseudomecas
- Species: P. pickeli

Binomial name
- Pseudomecas pickeli (Melzer, 1930)

Species of beetle

Pseudomecas pickeli is a species of beetle in the family Cerambycidae. It was described by Melzer in 1930.
