= Aereniphaula =

Scientific classification
- Domain: Eukaryota
- Kingdom: Animalia
- Phylum: Arthropoda
- Class: Insecta
- Order: Coleoptera
- Suborder: Polyphaga
- Infraorder: Cucujiformia
- Family: Cerambycidae
- Tribe: Aerenicini
- Genus: Aereniphaula
- Species: A. machadorum

Binomial name
- Aereniphaula machadorum Galileo & Martins 1990

Genus of beetles

Aereniphaula is a genus of beetles in the family Cerambycidae, containing a single species, Aereniphaula machadorum. It was described by Galileo and Martins in 1990.
