= Hydraschema obliquevittata =

Scientific classification
- Domain: Eukaryota
- Kingdom: Animalia
- Phylum: Arthropoda
- Class: Insecta
- Order: Coleoptera
- Suborder: Polyphaga
- Infraorder: Cucujiformia
- Family: Cerambycidae
- Genus: Hydraschema
- Species: H. obliquevittata

Binomial name
- Hydraschema obliquevittata (Lane, 1966)

Species of beetle

Hydraschema obliquevittata is a species of beetle in the family Cerambycidae. It was described by Lane in 1966.
