= Pseudomecas =

- Pseudomecas femoralis

Scientific classification
- Domain: Eukaryota
- Kingdom: Animalia
- Phylum: Arthropoda
- Class: Insecta
- Order: Coleoptera
- Suborder: Polyphaga
- Infraorder: Cucujiformia
- Family: Cerambycidae
- Tribe: Aerenicini
- Genus: Pseudomecas

Genus of beetles

Pseudomecas is a genus of beetles in the family Cerambycidae, containing the following species:

- Pseudomecas elegantissima Martins & Galileo, 1998
- Pseudomecas femoralis Aurivillius, 1920
- Pseudomecas nigricornis Martins & Galileo, 1998
- Pseudomecas pallidicornis Aurivillius, 1923
- Pseudomecas pickeli (Melzer, 1930)
- Pseudomecas suturalis Martins & Galileo, 1985
