= Propantodice =

Scientific classification
- Kingdom: Animalia
- Phylum: Arthropoda
- Class: Insecta
- Order: Coleoptera
- Suborder: Polyphaga
- Infraorder: Cucujiformia
- Family: Cerambycidae
- Genus: Propantodice
- Species: P. grisea

Binomial name
- Propantodice grisea Franz, 1954

Genus of beetles

Propantodice grisea is a species of beetle in the family Cerambycidae, and the only species in the genus Propantodice. It was described by Franz in 1954.
