= Apophaula =

Scientific classification
- Kingdom: Animalia
- Phylum: Arthropoda
- Class: Insecta
- Order: Coleoptera
- Suborder: Polyphaga
- Infraorder: Cucujiformia
- Family: Cerambycidae
- Genus: Apophaula
- Species: A. ocellata

Binomial name
- Apophaula ocellata Lane, 1973

Genus of beetles

Apophaula ocellata is a species of beetle in the family Cerambycidae, and the only species in the genus Apophaula. It was described by Lane in 1973.
