= Abacetus antiquus =

Scientific classification
- Kingdom: Animalia
- Phylum: Arthropoda
- Class: Insecta
- Order: Coleoptera
- Suborder: Adephaga
- Family: Carabidae
- Genus: Abacetus
- Species: A. antiquus

Binomial name
- Abacetus antiquus (Dejean, 1828)

Species of beetle

Abacetus antiquus is a species of ground beetle in the subfamily Pterostichinae. It was described by Pierre François Marie Auguste Dejean in 1828 and is found in India, Myanmar and Sri Lanka.
