= Rumacon =

Scientific classification
- Domain: Eukaryota
- Kingdom: Animalia
- Phylum: Arthropoda
- Class: Insecta
- Order: Coleoptera
- Suborder: Polyphaga
- Infraorder: Cucujiformia
- Family: Cerambycidae
- Genus: Rumacon

Genus of beetles

Rumacon is a genus of beetles in the family Cerambycidae, containing the following species:

- Rumacon annulicornis (Melzer, 1930)
- Rumacon canescens (Bruch, 1926)
