= Hoplistonychus =

Scientific classification
- Kingdom: Animalia
- Phylum: Arthropoda
- Clade: Pancrustacea
- Class: Insecta
- Order: Coleoptera
- Suborder: Polyphaga
- Infraorder: Cucujiformia
- Family: Cerambycidae
- Genus: Hoplistonychus
- Species: H. bondari

Binomial name
- Hoplistonychus bondari Melzer, 1930

Genus of beetles

Hoplistonychus bondari is a species of beetle in the family Cerambycidae, and the only species in the genus Hoplistonychus. It was described by Melzer in 1930.
