= Carlos Bruch =

Franz Karl Bruch or Carlos Bruch (1 April 1869 – 3 July 1943) was a German-born Argentinian entomologist and archaeological collector. He worked at the La Plata Museum.

== Early life ==
Karl was born in Munich to Christian Bruch. Christian ran a printing shop which he sold in 1887 and the family moved to Argentina to work with a South American Banknote Company in Buenos Aires. Karl, now Carlos, joined the Museum of La Plata which needed a photographic and printing assistant under Francisco P. Moreno. From 1888 to 1891, Christian and Carl helped set up the press in the Museum that allowed Moreno to produce scientific publications with photolithographic illustrations.

== Argentina ==
Bruch was interested in insects from a young age. Bruch made several collecting and documenting expeditions, on the Chile border in 1894 followed by trips to Paraguay, Santa Feco Chaco, the sierras of Córdoba, San Luis, Tandil and Ventana. In 1900, following the retirement of Fernando Lahille, Bruch became the head of zoology in the museum. In 1906 the museum was incorporated into the National University of La Plata and he was made a professor of zoology. He described a number of beetles and Hymenoptera. He was given an honorary doctorate in 1913. He donated his collection of nearly 50000 insect specimens to the La Plata Museum. He sent duplicate specimens to other entomologists around the world, and he is honoured in about 380 species including the genera Brucheiser, Bruchiana, Bruchomyia, Bruchiola, Bruchopria, Bruchomymar, Bruchaphodius, Bruchia, and Carlobruchia.
