= Apoaerenica =

Scientific classification
- Kingdom: Animalia
- Phylum: Arthropoda
- Class: Insecta
- Order: Coleoptera
- Suborder: Polyphaga
- Infraorder: Cucujiformia
- Family: Cerambycidae
- Genus: Apoaerenica; Martins & Galileo, 1985
- Species: A. martinsi

Binomial name
- Apoaerenica martinsi (Monné, 1979)

Synonyms
- Montesia martinsi Monné, 1979

Genus of beetles

Apoaerenica martinsi is a species of beetle in the family Cerambycidae, and the only species in the genus Apoaerenica. It was described by Monné in 1979.
