= Aphilesthes =

Scientific classification
- Kingdom: Animalia
- Phylum: Arthropoda
- Class: Insecta
- Order: Coleoptera
- Suborder: Polyphaga
- Infraorder: Cucujiformia
- Family: Cerambycidae
- Genus: Aphilesthes
- Species: A. rustica

Binomial name
- Aphilesthes rustica Bates, 1881

Genus of beetles

Aphilesthes rustica is a species of beetle assigned to the family Cerambycidae, and the only species in the genus Aphilesthes. It was described by Henry Walter Bates in 1881.
