= Phoebemima antiqua =

Scientific classification
- Domain: Eukaryota
- Kingdom: Animalia
- Phylum: Arthropoda
- Class: Insecta
- Order: Coleoptera
- Suborder: Polyphaga
- Infraorder: Cucujiformia
- Family: Cerambycidae
- Tribe: Hemilophini
- Genus: Phoebemima
- Species: P. antiqua

Binomial name
- Phoebemima antiqua (Gahan, 1889)

Synonyms
- Adesmus antiguus Gilmour, 1965; Adesmus antiquus Aurivillius, 1923; Amphionycha antiqua Gahan, 1889; Tacocha antiqua Martins & Galileo, 1993

Species of beetle

Phoebemima antiqua is a species of beetle in the family Cerambycidae. It was described by Charles Joseph Gahan in 1889. It is known from Brazil.
