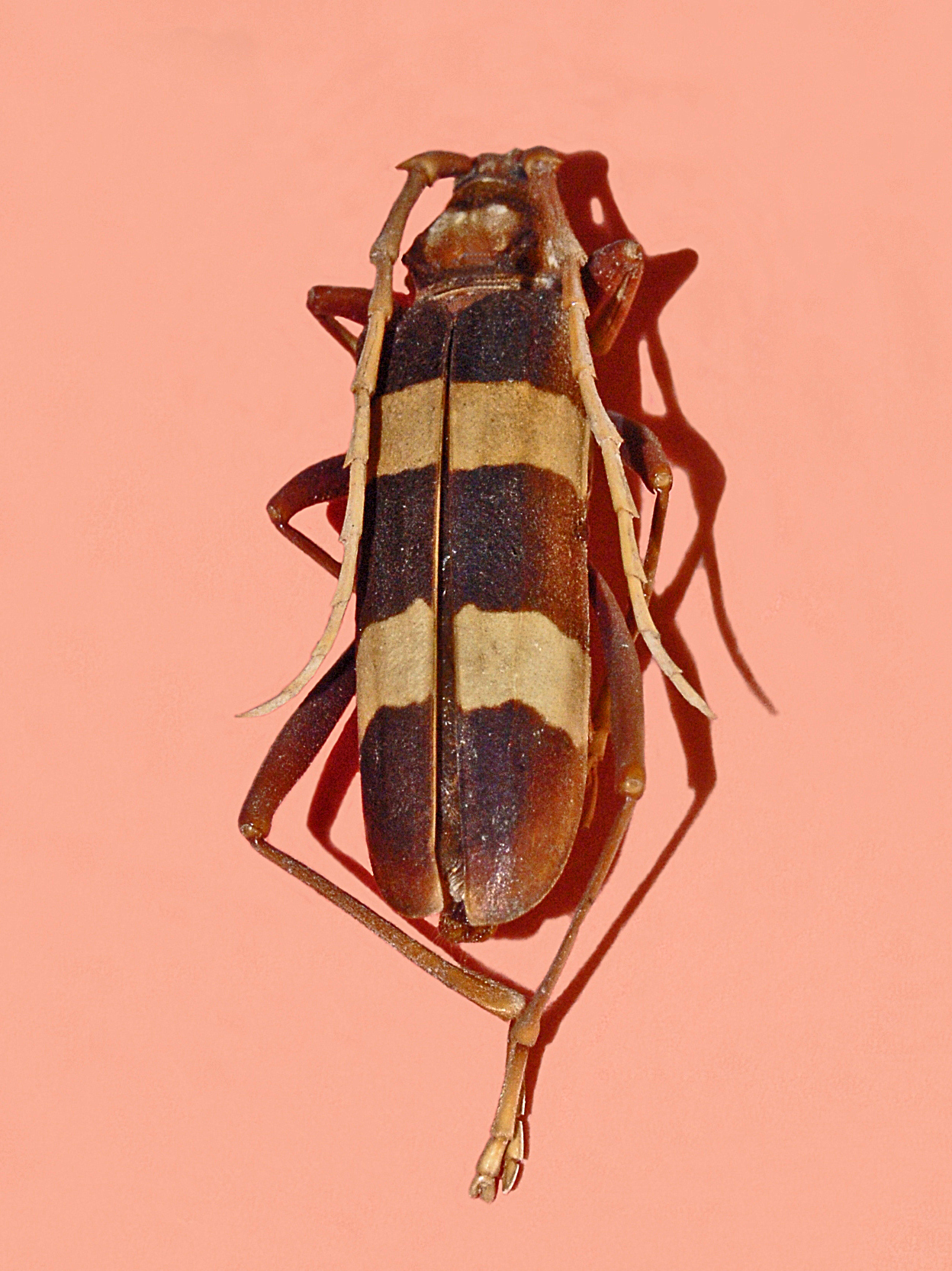
- Museum specimen of Aphrodisium griffithii

Scientific classification
- Domain: Eukaryota
- Kingdom: Animalia
- Phylum: Arthropoda
- Class: Insecta
- Order: Coleoptera
- Suborder: Polyphaga
- Infraorder: Cucujiformia
- Family: Cerambycidae
- Subfamily: Cerambycinae
- Tribe: Callichromatini
- Genus: Aphrodisium; Thomson, 1864

Synonyms
- Aromia (Tomentaromia) Plavilstshikov, 1934; Tomentaromia Plavilstshikov, 1934

= Aphrodisium (beetle) =

Genus of beetle

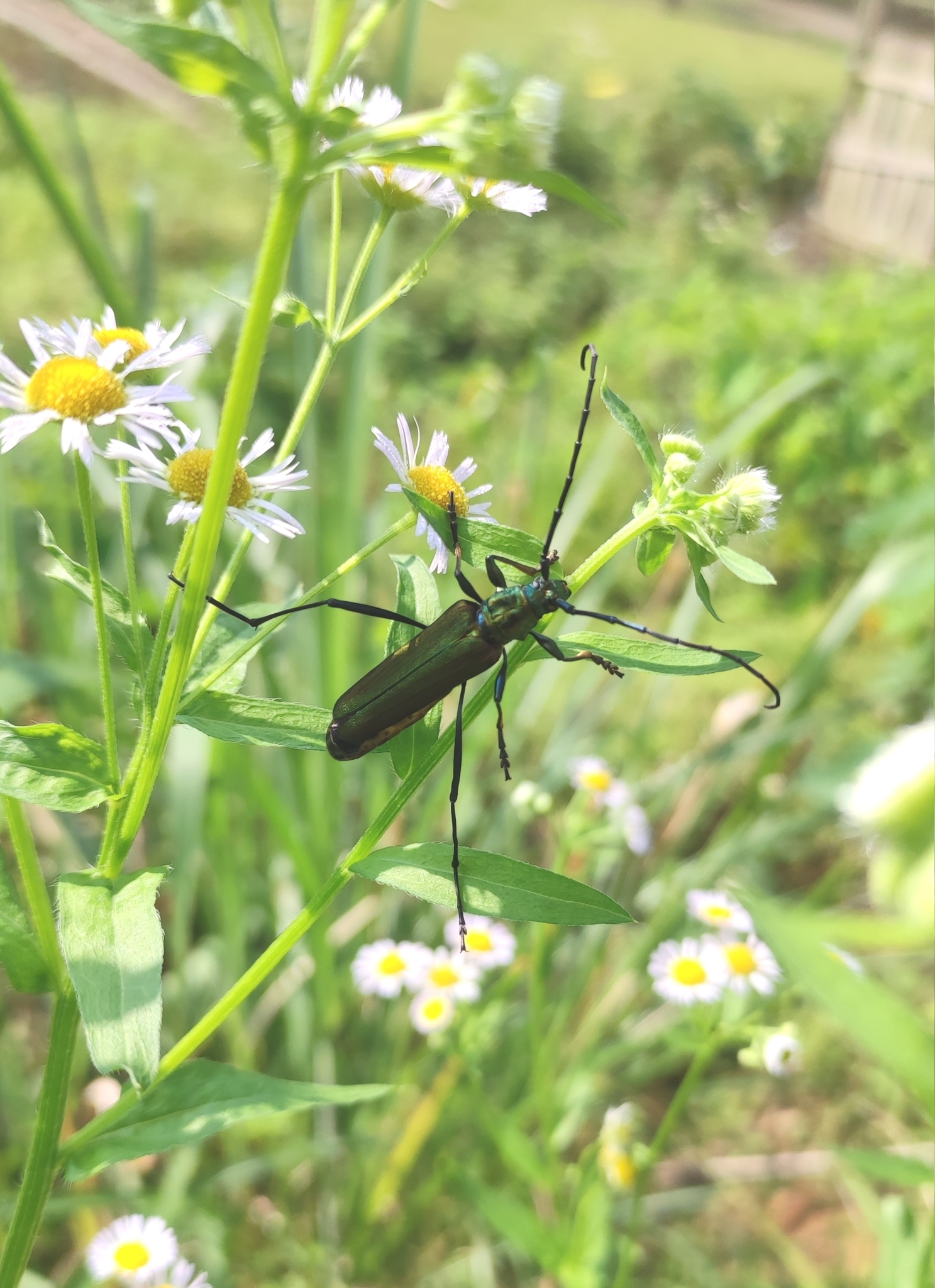
Aphrodisium sinicum, China

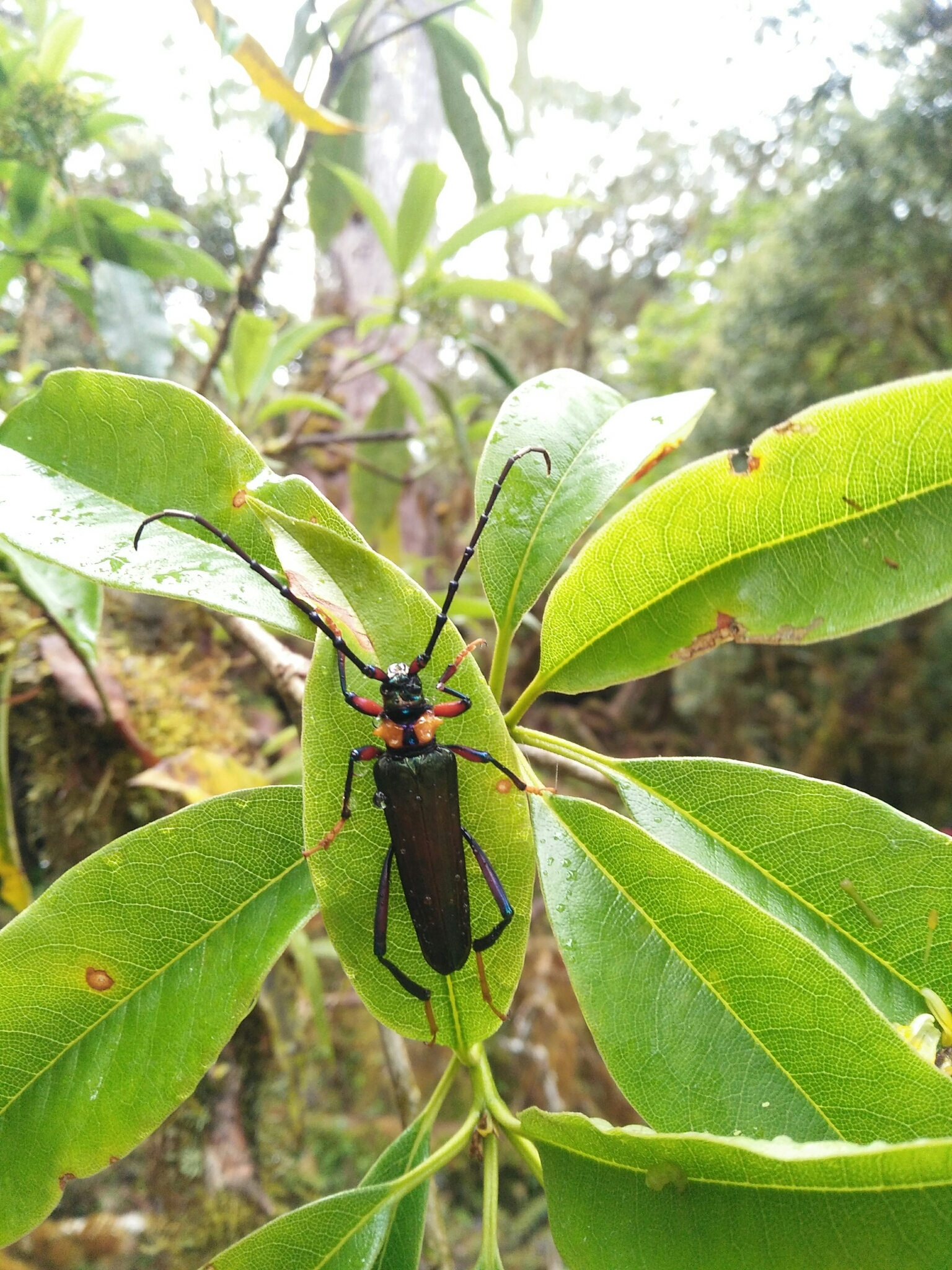
Aphrodisium faldermannii, Taiwan

Aphrodisium is a genus of round-necked longhorn beetles of the subfamily Cerambycinae.

== Species ==
These 46 species belong to the genus Aphrodisium:

- Aphrodisium albardae Ritsema, 1888 (Indonesia)
- Aphrodisium attenuatum Gressitt, 1951 (China)
- Aphrodisium basifemorale (Pic, 1902) (China)
- Aphrodisium cantori (Hope, 1839) (South and Southeast Asia)
- Aphrodisium convexicolle Gressitt & Rondon, 1970 (Laos)
- Aphrodisium cribricolle Van de Poll, 1890 (South and Southeast Asia)
- Aphrodisium delatouchii Fairmaire, 1886 (China, Vietnam)
- Aphrodisium distinctipes (Pic, 1904) (China)
- Aphrodisium faldermannii (Saunders, 1853) (Palearctic)
- Aphrodisium gibbicolle (White, 1853) (South and Southeast Asia)
- Aphrodisium gregoryi (Podaný, 1971) (China)
- Aphrodisium griffithii Hope, 1839 (South and Southeast Asia)
- Aphrodisium hardwickianum (White, 1853) (India, Nepal)
- Aphrodisium holzschuhi Skale & Vitali, 2021 (Southeast Asia)
- Aphrodisium implicatum (Pic, 1920) (China)
- Aphrodisium inexspectatum Podaný, 1971 (China)
- Aphrodisium instrigosum (Pic, 1937) (India)
- Aphrodisium laosense Gressitt & Rondon, 1970 (Laos)
- Aphrodisium lingafelteri Vives & Pham, 2017 (Vietnam)
- Aphrodisium luzonicum Schultze, 1920 (Philippines)
- Aphrodisium major Gressitt & Rondon, 1970 (China, Laos)
- Aphrodisium metallicolle (Gressitt, 1939) (China, India)
- Aphrodisium muelleri Tippmann, 1955 (China)
- Aphrodisium neoxenum (White, 1853) (China, India, Taiwan)
- Aphrodisium niisatoi Vives & Bentanachs, 2007 (China, Vietnam)
- Aphrodisium noexenum (White, 1855) (temperate Asia)
- Aphrodisium ohkurai Hayashi, 1992 (Philippines)
- Aphrodisium panayarum Schultze, 1920 (Philippines)
- Aphrodisium planicolle Van de Poll, 1890 (India)
- Aphrodisium robustum (Bates, 1879) (China, India)
- Aphrodisium rufofemoratum Gressitt & Rondon, 1970 (Laos)
- Aphrodisium sabinae Skale & Vitali, 2021 (Vietnam)
- Aphrodisium sauteri (Matsushita, 1933) (China, Taiwan)
- Aphrodisium saxosicolle Fairmaire, 1902 (China, Vietnam)
- Aphrodisium schoenmanni (Skale & Weigel, 2017) (Vietnam)
- Aphrodisium schwarzeri Podaný, 1971 (China)
- Aphrodisium semignitum (Chevrolat, 1841) (Philippines)
- Aphrodisium semipurpureum Pic, 1925 (China, Laos, Vietnam)
- Aphrodisium sinicum (White, 1853) (South and Southeast Asia)
- Aphrodisium strandi Plavilstshikov, 1932 (India)
- Aphrodisium thibetanum Pic, 1925 (China)
- Aphrodisium tonkineum Pic, 1925 (Vietnam)
- Aphrodisium tricoloripes Pic, 1925 (South and Southeast Asia)
- Aphrodisium vermiculosum Gressitt, 1942 (China)
- Aphrodisium viridescens Hayashi, 1974 (China, Taiwan)
- Aphrodisium viridiaeneum Hayashi, 1992 (Philippines)
