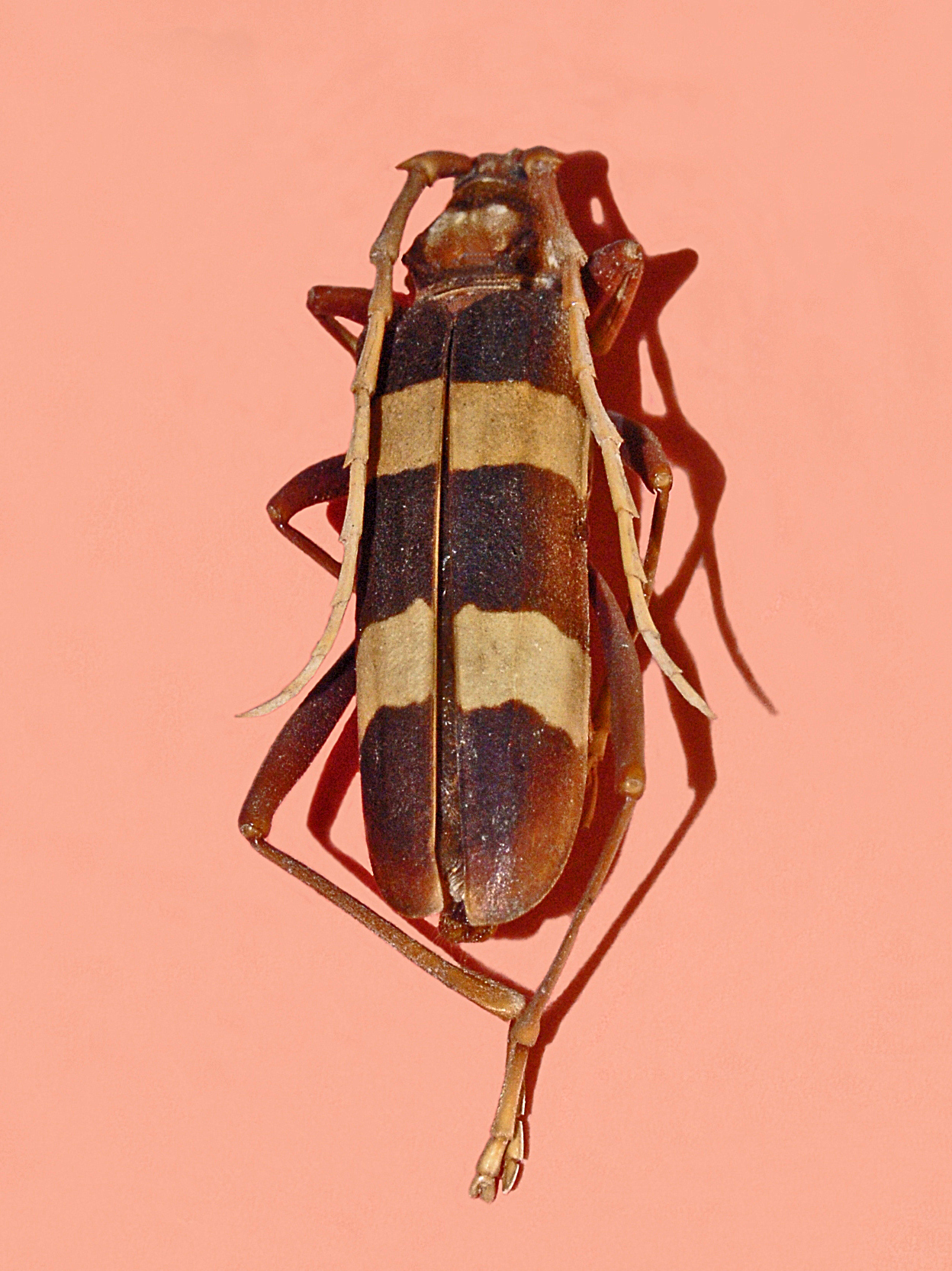
- Museum specimen of Aphrodisium griffithii

Scientific classification
- Kingdom: Animalia
- Phylum: Arthropoda
- Class: Insecta
- Order: Coleoptera
- Suborder: Polyphaga
- Infraorder: Cucujiformia
- Family: Cerambycidae
- Genus: Aphrodisium
- Species: A. griffithii

Binomial name
- Aphrodisium griffithii Hope, 1839

Synonyms
- Callichroma griffithii Hope, 1839

= Aphrodisium griffithii =

Species of beetle

Aphrodisium griffithii, the veined Capricorn beetle, is a species of round-necked longhorn beetles of the subfamily Cerambycinae.

== Description ==
Aphrodisium griffithii can reach a body length of about 45–47 millimetres (1.8–1.9 in) and a body width of about 12 millimetres (0.47 in). Head, prothorax, antennae and legs are reddish brown. Elytra are violaceous black, with dark brown tomentum and show two transversal fulvous bands.

== Distribution ==
This species can be found in Vietnam.
