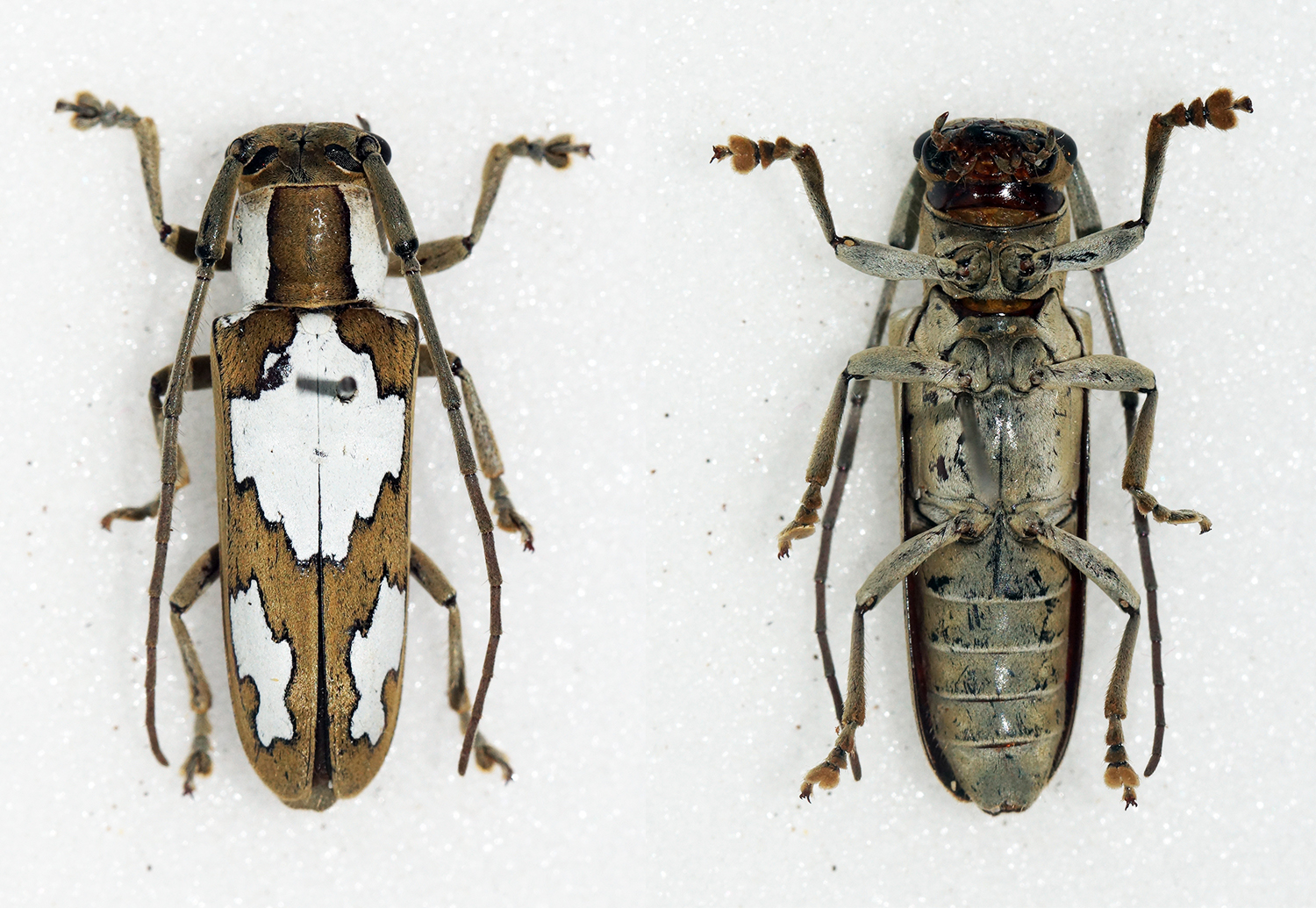
- Adesmus divus

Scientific classification
- Kingdom: Animalia
- Phylum: Arthropoda
- Clade: Pancrustacea
- Class: Insecta
- Order: Coleoptera
- Suborder: Polyphaga
- Infraorder: Cucujiformia
- Family: Cerambycidae
- Subfamily: Lamiinae
- Tribe: Hemilophini; Thomson, 1868

= Hemilophini =

Tribe of beetles

Hemilophini is a tribe of longhorn beetles of the subfamily Lamiinae.

== Taxonomy ==
The following genera are recognised in the tribe Hemilophini:

- Abanycha
- Abycendaua
- Acabanga
- Acaiatuca
- Acaiu
- Acapiata
- Acasanga
- Adesmiella
- Adesmoides
- Adesmus
- Alampyris
- Amapanesia
- Apagomera
- Apagomerella
- Apagomerina
- Apeba
- Apebusu
- Apypema
- Arabela
- Arixiuna
- Biraerana
- Butocrysa
- Cabreuva
- Cacupira
- Callanga
- Calocosmus
- Camposiellina
- Canarana
- Cariua
- Cathetopteron
- Cendiuna
- Cendiunopsis
- Cephalodina
- Chrysaperda
- Cirrhicera
- Clythraschema
- Columbicella
- Corcovado
- Costemilophus
- Cotyabanycha
- Cotyadesmus
- Cotycuara
- Cotysomerida
- Cuicirama
- Dadoychus
- Dylobolus
- Egalicia
- Endybauna
- Eranina
- Eraninella
- Esamirim
- Essostrutha
- Essostruthella
- Eulachnesia
- Frankluquetia
- Fredlanea
- Gagarinia
- Guayuriba
- Guyarolea
- Hemierana
- Hemiloapis
- Hemilocrinitus
- Hemilomecopterus
- Hemilophus
- Hilarolea
- Hilaroleopsis
- Homodontus
- Iareonycha
- Iarucanga
- Iatuca
- Ibitiruna
- Icaunauna
- Icimauna
- Icupima
- Ipepo
- Iquiara
- Ischnophygas
- Isomerida
- Itaituba
- Ites
- Itumbiara
- Juninia
- Kuatinga
- Kyranycha
- Lamacoscylus
- Lapazina
- Lycaneptia
- Lycidola
- Lycomimus
- Malacoscylus
- Mariliana
- Melzerina
- Mexicoscylus
- Mocoiasura
- Murupeaca
- Neomoema
- Ochromima
- Ocoa
- Oedudes
- Okamira
- Olivensa
- Paleohemilophus
- Parapeba
- Parauna
- Phoebe
- Phoebella
- Piratininga
- Piruanycha
- Porangonycha
- Potiapunga
- Poticuara
- Pseudegalicia
- Pseudotacocha
- Purusia
- Purusiella
- Pyrobolus
- Quatiara
- Quirimbaua
- Schmidarius
- Sibapipunga
- Spathoptera
- Susuanycha
- Sybaguasu
- Tabatinga
- Tarapiampa
- Tetamauara
- Tetanola
- Themistonoe
- Tyrinthia
- Unaporanga
- Woytkowskia
- Zeale
