= Amphionycha =

Amphionycha may refer to:

- Amphionycha Dejean, 1835, a genus of beetles in the family Cerambycidae, synonym of Adesmus
- Amphionycha Leséleuc, 1844, a genus of beetles in the family Cerambycidae, synonym of Quatiara
- Amphionycha LeConte, 1852, a genus of beetles in the family Cerambycidae, synonym of Hemierana
