= Ocoa =

Ocoa may refer to:

== Places ==
- San José de Ocoa, Dominican Republic
- Ocoa, Chile, a populated area
- Ocoa Valley, a valley in Chile

== Animals ==
- Ocoa ochromimoides, a species of beetle
- Evocoa or Ocoa, a genus of flies
