= Egalicia flavescens =

Scientific classification
- Domain: Eukaryota
- Kingdom: Animalia
- Phylum: Arthropoda
- Class: Insecta
- Order: Coleoptera
- Suborder: Polyphaga
- Infraorder: Cucujiformia
- Family: Cerambycidae
- Tribe: Hemilophini
- Genus: Egalicia
- Species: E. flavescens

Binomial name
- Egalicia flavescens (Thomson, 1864)

Species of beetle

Egalicia flavescens is a species of beetle in the family Cerambycidae. It was described by Thomson in 1864. It is known from Brazil.
