= Phoebella albomaculata =

Scientific classification
- Domain: Eukaryota
- Kingdom: Animalia
- Phylum: Arthropoda
- Class: Insecta
- Order: Coleoptera
- Suborder: Polyphaga
- Infraorder: Cucujiformia
- Family: Cerambycidae
- Tribe: Hemilophini
- Genus: Phoebella
- Species: P. albomaculata

Binomial name
- Phoebella albomaculata (Gahan, 1889)

Synonyms
- Adesmus albomaculatus Aurivillius, 1923; Adesmus albomaculatus Blackwelder, 1946; Adesmus albomaculatus Gilmour, 1965; Amphionycha albomaculata Gahan, 1889

Genus of beetles

Phoebella albomaculata is a species of longhorn beetle in the family Cerambycidae. It was described by Gahan in 1889.
