= Callanga trichocera =

Scientific classification
- Domain: Eukaryota
- Kingdom: Animalia
- Phylum: Arthropoda
- Class: Insecta
- Order: Coleoptera
- Suborder: Polyphaga
- Infraorder: Cucujiformia
- Family: Cerambycidae
- Tribe: Hemilophini
- Genus: Callanga
- Species: C. trichocera

Binomial name
- Callanga trichocera Lane, 1973

Species of beetle

Callanga trichocera is a species of beetle in the family Cerambycidae. It was described by Lane in 1973. It is known from Bolivia and Peru.
