= Acaiatuca quadricostata =

Scientific classification
- Domain: Eukaryota
- Kingdom: Animalia
- Phylum: Arthropoda
- Class: Insecta
- Order: Coleoptera
- Suborder: Polyphaga
- Infraorder: Cucujiformia
- Family: Cerambycidae
- Tribe: Hemilophini
- Genus: Acaiatuca
- Species: A. quadricostata

Binomial name
- Acaiatuca quadricostata (Tippmann, 1953)

Synonyms
- Lycaneptia quadricostata Tippmann, 1953

Species of beetle

Acaiatuca quadricostata is a species of beetle in the family Cerambycidae. It was described by Tippmann in 1953. It is known from Brazil.
