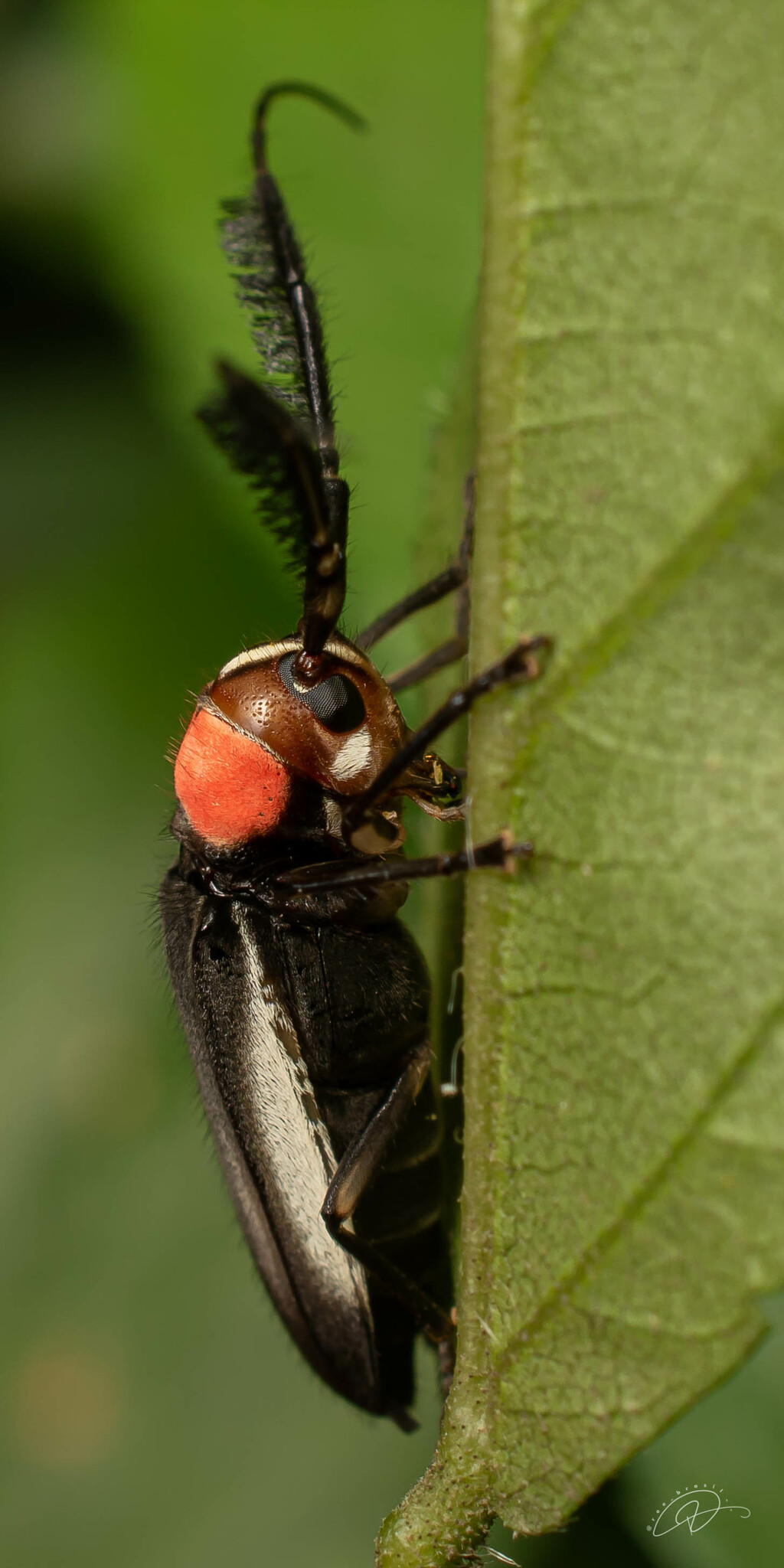

Scientific classification
- Domain: Eukaryota
- Kingdom: Animalia
- Phylum: Arthropoda
- Class: Insecta
- Order: Coleoptera
- Suborder: Polyphaga
- Infraorder: Cucujiformia
- Family: Cerambycidae
- Tribe: Hemilophini
- Genus: Hemilophus
- Species: H. dimidiaticornis

Binomial name
- Hemilophus dimidiaticornis Audinet-Serville, 1835

= Hemilophus dimidiaticornis =

Species of beetle

Hemilophus dimidiaticornis is a species of beetle in the family Cerambycidae. It was described by Audinet-Serville in 1835. It is known from Paraguay, Brazil, and Argentina.
