= Piruanycha pitilla =

Scientific classification
- Domain: Eukaryota
- Kingdom: Animalia
- Phylum: Arthropoda
- Class: Insecta
- Order: Coleoptera
- Suborder: Polyphaga
- Infraorder: Cucujiformia
- Family: Cerambycidae
- Tribe: Hemilophini
- Genus: Piruanycha
- Species: P. pitilla

Binomial name
- Piruanycha pitilla Galileo & Martins, 2005

Species of beetle

Piruanycha pitilla is a species of beetle in the family Cerambycidae. It was described by Galileo and Martins in 2005. It is known from Costa Rica.
