= Itaituba miniacea =

Scientific classification
- Domain: Eukaryota
- Kingdom: Animalia
- Phylum: Arthropoda
- Class: Insecta
- Order: Coleoptera
- Suborder: Polyphaga
- Infraorder: Cucujiformia
- Family: Cerambycidae
- Tribe: Hemilophini
- Genus: Itaituba
- Species: I. miniacea

Binomial name
- Itaituba miniacea (Bates, 1866)

Synonyms
- Amphionycha miniacea Bates, 1866; Hemilophus miniaceus Gemminger & Harold, 1873; Hilarolea miniacea Bates, 1881; Itaituba truncata Lane, 1950; Itatiuba miniacea Monné & Giesbert, 1994

Species of beetle

Itaituba miniacea is a species of beetle in the family Cerambycidae. It was described by Henry Walter Bates in 1866. It is known from Brazil.
