= Purusia acreana =

Scientific classification
- Domain: Eukaryota
- Kingdom: Animalia
- Phylum: Arthropoda
- Class: Insecta
- Order: Coleoptera
- Suborder: Polyphaga
- Infraorder: Cucujiformia
- Family: Cerambycidae
- Tribe: Hemilophini
- Genus: Purusia
- Species: P. acreana

Binomial name
- Purusia acreana Lane, 1956

Species of beetle

Purusia acreana is a species of beetle in the family Cerambycidae. It was described by Lane in 1956. It is known from Brazil, Ecuador and Bolivia.
