= Egalicia testacea =

Scientific classification
- Domain: Eukaryota
- Kingdom: Animalia
- Phylum: Arthropoda
- Class: Insecta
- Order: Coleoptera
- Suborder: Polyphaga
- Infraorder: Cucujiformia
- Family: Cerambycidae
- Tribe: Hemilophini
- Genus: Egalicia
- Species: E. testacea

Binomial name
- Egalicia testacea (Bates, 1866)

Species of beetle

Egalicia testacea is a species of beetle in the family Cerambycidae. It was described by Henry Walter Bates in 1866. It was discovered, and primarily lives, in Brazil.
