= Phoebella tinga =

Scientific classification
- Domain: Eukaryota
- Kingdom: Animalia
- Phylum: Arthropoda
- Class: Insecta
- Order: Coleoptera
- Suborder: Polyphaga
- Infraorder: Cucujiformia
- Family: Cerambycidae
- Tribe: Hemilophini
- Genus: Phoebella
- Species: P. tinga

Binomial name
- Phoebella tinga Martins & Galileo, 1998

Synonyms
- Phoebe tinga Martins & Galileo, 1998

Species of beetle

Phoebella tinga is a species of beetle in the family Cerambycidae. It was described by Martins and Galileo in 1998. It is known from Argentina.
