= Acabanga nigrohumeralis =

Scientific classification
- Domain: Eukaryota
- Kingdom: Animalia
- Phylum: Arthropoda
- Class: Insecta
- Order: Coleoptera
- Suborder: Polyphaga
- Infraorder: Cucujiformia
- Family: Cerambycidae
- Tribe: Hemilophini
- Genus: Acabanga
- Species: A. nigrohumeralis

Binomial name
- Acabanga nigrohumeralis (Tippmann, 1960)

Synonyms
- Lycidola palliata ab. nigrohumeralis Tippmann, 1960

Species of beetle

Acabanga nigrohumeralis is a species of beetle in the family Cerambycidae. It was described by Tippmann in 1960. It is known from Brazil.
