= Piruanycha ocoa =

Scientific classification
- Domain: Eukaryota
- Kingdom: Animalia
- Phylum: Arthropoda
- Class: Insecta
- Order: Coleoptera
- Suborder: Polyphaga
- Infraorder: Cucujiformia
- Family: Cerambycidae
- Tribe: Hemilophini
- Genus: Piruanycha
- Species: P. ocoa

Binomial name
- Piruanycha ocoa Martins & Galileo, 1997

Species of beetle

Piruanycha ocoa is a species of beetle in the family Cerambycidae. It was described by Martins and Galileo in 1997. It is known from Colombia.
