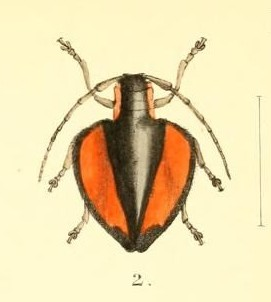

Scientific classification
- Domain: Eukaryota
- Kingdom: Animalia
- Phylum: Arthropoda
- Class: Insecta
- Order: Coleoptera
- Suborder: Polyphaga
- Infraorder: Cucujiformia
- Family: Cerambycidae
- Tribe: Hemilophini
- Genus: Ites
- Species: I. plagiatus

Binomial name
- Ites plagiatus Waterhouse, 1880

Synonyms
- Lycodesmus superbus Melzer 1927

= Ites plagiatus =

Species of beetle

Ites plagiatus is a species of beetle in the family Cerambycidae. It was described by Waterhouse in 1880. It is known from Ecuador, Brazil and Bolivia.
