= Cuicirama cayennensis =

Scientific classification
- Domain: Eukaryota
- Kingdom: Animalia
- Phylum: Arthropoda
- Class: Insecta
- Order: Coleoptera
- Suborder: Polyphaga
- Infraorder: Cucujiformia
- Family: Cerambycidae
- Tribe: Hemilophini
- Genus: Cuicirama
- Species: C. cayennensis

Binomial name
- Cuicirama cayennensis (Bates, 1881)

Species of beetle

Cuicirama cayennensis is a species of beetle in the family Cerambycidae. It was described by Henry Walter Bates in 1881. It is known from French Guiana.
