= Tarapiampa ocreata =

Scientific classification
- Domain: Eukaryota
- Kingdom: Animalia
- Phylum: Arthropoda
- Class: Insecta
- Order: Coleoptera
- Suborder: Polyphaga
- Infraorder: Cucujiformia
- Family: Cerambycidae
- Tribe: Hemilophini
- Genus: Tarapiampa
- Species: T. ocreata

Binomial name
- Tarapiampa ocreata (Bates, 1885)

Synonyms
- Adesmus ocreatus Aurivillius, 1923; Amphionycha ocreata Bates, 1885; Piampatara ocreata (Bates, 1885)

Species of beetle

Tarapiampa ocreata is a species of longhorn beetle in the family Cerambycidae. It was described by Henry Walter Bates in 1885. It is known from Panama and Costa Rica.
