= Hemilophus unicolor =

Scientific classification
- Domain: Eukaryota
- Kingdom: Animalia
- Phylum: Arthropoda
- Class: Insecta
- Order: Coleoptera
- Suborder: Polyphaga
- Infraorder: Cucujiformia
- Family: Cerambycidae
- Tribe: Hemilophini
- Genus: Hemilophus
- Species: H. unicolor

Binomial name
- Hemilophus unicolor Bates, 1881

Species of beetle

Hemilophus unicolor is a species of beetle in the family Cerambycidae. It was described by Bates in 1881. It is known from Argentina, Paraguay, and Brazil.
