= Calocosmus melanurus =

Scientific classification
- Kingdom: Animalia
- Phylum: Arthropoda
- Class: Insecta
- Order: Coleoptera
- Suborder: Polyphaga
- Infraorder: Cucujiformia
- Family: Cerambycidae
- Genus: Calocosmus
- Species: C. melanurus

Binomial name
- Calocosmus melanurus Gahan, 1889

Synonyms
- Calocosmus melanura Linsley, 1961

Species of beetle

Calocosmus melanurus is a species of beetle in the family Cerambycidae. It was described by Gahan in 1889. It is known from the Dominican Republic and Haiti.
