= Potiapunga =

Scientific classification
- Domain: Eukaryota
- Kingdom: Animalia
- Phylum: Arthropoda
- Class: Insecta
- Order: Coleoptera
- Suborder: Polyphaga
- Infraorder: Cucujiformia
- Family: Cerambycidae
- Tribe: Hemilophini
- Genus: Potiapunga
- Species: P. lata

Binomial name
- Potiapunga lata Galileo & Martins, 2013

Genus of beetles

Potiapunga lata is a species of beetle in the family Cerambycidae and subfamily Lamiinae. It was described by Galileo and Martins in 2013. It is known to live in Bolivia.
