= Hemiloapis =

Scientific classification
- Kingdom: Animalia
- Phylum: Arthropoda
- Class: Insecta
- Order: Coleoptera
- Suborder: Polyphaga
- Infraorder: Cucujiformia
- Family: Cerambycidae
- Subfamily: Lamiinae
- Tribe: Hemilophini
- Genus: Hemiloapis; Galileo & Martins, 2004

Genus of beetles

Hemiloapis is a genus of longhorn beetles of the subfamily Lamiinae, containing the following species:

- Hemiloapis endyba Galileo & Martins, 2004
- Hemiloapis mena Martins & Galileo, 2006
- Hemiloapis yandaira Galileo & Martins, 2004
- Hemiloapis ybyra Galileo & Martins, 2004
