= Abycendaua duplicata =

Scientific classification
- Domain: Eukaryota
- Kingdom: Animalia
- Phylum: Arthropoda
- Class: Insecta
- Order: Coleoptera
- Suborder: Polyphaga
- Infraorder: Cucujiformia
- Family: Cerambycidae
- Tribe: Hemilophini
- Genus: Abycendaua
- Species: A. duplicata

Binomial name
- Abycendaua duplicata (Bates, 1881)

Genus of beetles

Abycendaua duplicata is a species of beetle in the family Cerambycidae, and the only species in the genus Abycendaua. It was described by Henry Walter Bates in 1881.
