= Acasanga humeralis =

Scientific classification
- Kingdom: Animalia
- Phylum: Arthropoda
- Class: Insecta
- Order: Coleoptera
- Suborder: Polyphaga
- Infraorder: Cucujiformia
- Family: Cerambycidae
- Genus: Acasanga
- Species: A. humeralis

Binomial name
- Acasanga humeralis (Waterhouse, 1880)

Synonyms
- Hemilophus humeralis Lameere, 1883; Themistonoe humeralis Bates, 1881; Themistonoë humeralis Waterhouse, 1880

Species of beetle

Acasanga humeralis is a species of beetle in the family Cerambycidae. It was described by Waterhouse in 1880. It is known from Ecuador.
