= Canarana (beetle) =

Scientific classification
- Kingdom: Animalia
- Phylum: Arthropoda
- Class: Insecta
- Order: Coleoptera
- Suborder: Polyphaga
- Infraorder: Cucujiformia
- Family: Cerambycidae
- Subfamily: Lamiinae
- Tribe: Hemilophini
- Genus: Canarana; Martins & Galileo, 1992

Genus of beetles

Canarana is a genus of longhorn beetles of the subfamily Lamiinae, containing the following species:

- Canarana affinis (Aurivillius, 1908)
- Canarana arguta Martins & Galileo, 2008
- Canarana brachialis (Guérin-Méneville, 1855)
- Canarana exotica Galileo & Martins, 2001
- Canarana marceloi Martins & Galileo, 1992
- Canarana nigripennis (Bates, 1866)
- Canarana roseicollis Galileo & Martins, 2004
- Canarana seminigra (Bates, 1866)
- Canarana tuberculicollis (Guérin-Méneville, 1855)
