= Calocosmus venustus =

Scientific classification
- Kingdom: Animalia
- Phylum: Arthropoda
- Class: Insecta
- Order: Coleoptera
- Suborder: Polyphaga
- Infraorder: Cucujiformia
- Family: Cerambycidae
- Genus: Calocosmus
- Species: C. venustus

Binomial name
- Calocosmus venustus (Chevrolat in Guérin-Méneville, 1838)

Synonyms
- Amphionycha venusta Chevrolat, 1838; Hemilophus venustus Jacquelin du Val, 1857

Species of beetle

Calocosmus venustus is a species of beetle in the family Cerambycidae. It was described by Chevrolat in 1838. It is known from the Bahamas, Cuba, and Jamaica.
