= Mariliana hovorei =

Scientific classification
- Kingdom: Animalia
- Phylum: Arthropoda
- Class: Insecta
- Order: Coleoptera
- Suborder: Polyphaga
- Infraorder: Cucujiformia
- Family: Cerambycidae
- Genus: Mariliana
- Species: M. hovorei

Binomial name
- Mariliana hovorei Galileo & Martins, 2005

Species of beetle

Mariliana hovorei is a species of beetle in the family Cerambycidae. It was described by Galileo and Martins in 2005. It is known from Ecuador.
