= Cacupira tucurui =

Scientific classification
- Kingdom: Animalia
- Phylum: Arthropoda
- Class: Insecta
- Order: Coleoptera
- Suborder: Polyphaga
- Infraorder: Cucujiformia
- Family: Cerambycidae
- Genus: Cacupira
- Species: C. tucurui

Binomial name
- Cacupira tucurui Martins & Galileo, 1991

Species of beetle

Cacupira tucurui is a species of beetle in the family Cerambycidae. It was described by Martins and Galileo in 1991. It is known from Brazil and French Guiana.
