= Arixiuna longula =

Scientific classification
- Kingdom: Animalia
- Phylum: Arthropoda
- Class: Insecta
- Order: Coleoptera
- Suborder: Polyphaga
- Infraorder: Cucujiformia
- Family: Cerambycidae
- Genus: Arixiuna
- Species: A. longula

Binomial name
- Arixiuna longula (Bates, 1881)

Synonyms
- Hemilophus longulus Bates, 1881

Species of beetle

Arixiuna longula is a species of beetle in the family Cerambycidae. It was described by Bates in 1881. It is known from Mexico.
