= Calocosmus janus =

Scientific classification
- Kingdom: Animalia
- Phylum: Arthropoda
- Class: Insecta
- Order: Coleoptera
- Suborder: Polyphaga
- Infraorder: Cucujiformia
- Family: Cerambycidae
- Genus: Calocosmus
- Species: C. janus

Binomial name
- Calocosmus janus Bates, 1881

Synonyms
- Calocosmus holosericeus Gahan, 1889; Hemilophus janus Lameere, 1883

Species of beetle

Calocosmus janus is a species of beetle in the family Cerambycidae. It was described by Henry Walter Bates in 1881. It is known from Haiti, Cuba, and the Dominican Republic.
