= Callanga =

Scientific classification
- Domain: Eukaryota
- Kingdom: Animalia
- Phylum: Arthropoda
- Class: Insecta
- Order: Coleoptera
- Suborder: Polyphaga
- Infraorder: Cucujiformia
- Family: Cerambycidae
- Tribe: Hemilophini
- Genus: Callanga

Genus of beetles

Callanga is a genus of longhorn beetles of the subfamily Lamiinae, containing the following species:

- Callanga tenebrosa Lane, 1973
- Callanga trichocera Lane, 1973
