= Mariliana ocularis =

Scientific classification
- Kingdom: Animalia
- Phylum: Arthropoda
- Class: Insecta
- Order: Coleoptera
- Suborder: Polyphaga
- Infraorder: Cucujiformia
- Family: Cerambycidae
- Genus: Mariliana
- Species: M. ocularis

Binomial name
- Mariliana ocularis (Hope, 1846)

Synonyms
- Adesmus ocularis (Hope) Aurivillius, 1923; Amphionycha ocularis (Hope) Bates, 1881; Saperda ocularis Hope, 1846

Species of beetle

Mariliana ocularis is a species of beetle in the family Cerambycidae. It was described by Hope in 1846. It is known from Argentina and Brazil.
