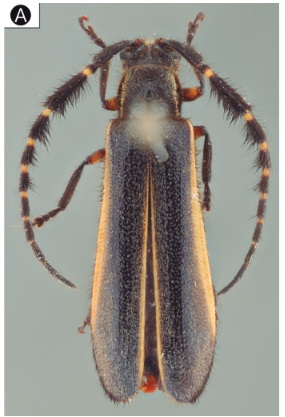

Scientific classification
- Kingdom: Animalia
- Phylum: Arthropoda
- Clade: Pancrustacea
- Class: Insecta
- Order: Coleoptera
- Suborder: Polyphaga
- Infraorder: Cucujiformia
- Family: Cerambycidae
- Genus: Cendiuna
- Species: C. puranga

Binomial name
- Cendiuna puranga Galileo & Martins, 1991

= Cendiuna puranga =

Species of beetle

Cendiuna puranga is a species of beetle in the family Cerambycidae. It was described by Galileo and Martins in 1991. It is known from Brazil.
