= Esamirim =

Scientific classification
- Kingdom: Animalia
- Phylum: Arthropoda
- Class: Insecta
- Order: Coleoptera
- Suborder: Polyphaga
- Infraorder: Cucujiformia
- Family: Cerambycidae
- Subfamily: Lamiinae
- Tribe: Hemilophini
- Genus: Esamirim; Martins & Galileo, 2004

Genus of beetles

Esamirim is a genus of longhorn beetles of the subfamily Lamiinae, containing the following species:

- Esamirim carinatus Martins & Galileo, 2004
- Esamirim chionides (Bates, 1885)
- Esamirim divisus Martins & Galileo, 2004
- Esamirim fasciatus Martins & Galileo, 2004
