= Cephalodina crassiceps =

Scientific classification
- Kingdom: Animalia
- Phylum: Arthropoda
- Class: Insecta
- Order: Coleoptera
- Suborder: Polyphaga
- Infraorder: Cucujiformia
- Family: Cerambycidae
- Genus: Cephalodina
- Species: C. crassiceps

Binomial name
- Cephalodina crassiceps Bates, 1881

Synonyms
- Amphionycha crassiceps (Bates, 1881)

Species of beetle

Cephalodina crassiceps is a species of beetle in the family Cerambycidae. It was described by Bates in 1881. It is known from Costa Rica, Mexico, Panama and Nicaragua.
