= Gagarinia borgmeieri =

Scientific classification
- Kingdom: Animalia
- Phylum: Arthropoda
- Class: Insecta
- Order: Coleoptera
- Suborder: Polyphaga
- Infraorder: Cucujiformia
- Family: Cerambycidae
- Genus: Gagarinia
- Species: G. borgmeieri

Binomial name
- Gagarinia borgmeieri (Bondar, 1938)

Species of beetle

Gagarinia borgmeieri is a species of beetle in the family Cerambycidae. It was described by Bondar in 1938. It is known from French Guiana and Brazil.
