= Gagarinia aureolata =

Scientific classification
- Kingdom: Animalia
- Phylum: Arthropoda
- Class: Insecta
- Order: Coleoptera
- Suborder: Polyphaga
- Infraorder: Cucujiformia
- Family: Cerambycidae
- Genus: Gagarinia
- Species: G. aureolata

Binomial name
- Gagarinia aureolata (Lane, 1950)

Species of beetle

Gagarinia aureolata is a species of beetle in the family Cerambycidae. It was described by Lane in 1950. It is known from Brazil.
