= Hilarolea =

Scientific classification
- Kingdom: Animalia
- Phylum: Arthropoda
- Class: Insecta
- Order: Coleoptera
- Suborder: Polyphaga
- Infraorder: Cucujiformia
- Family: Cerambycidae
- Subfamily: Lamiinae
- Tribe: Hemilophini
- Genus: Hilarolea; Thomson, 1868
- Species: H. incensa

Binomial name
- Hilarolea incensa (Perty, 1832)

Genus of beetles

Hilarolea incensa is a species of beetle in the family Cerambycidae, and the only species in the genus Hilarolea. It was described by Perty in 1832.It is mainly found in South America's tropical and subtropical climates. The species is well-known for both its unique look and ecological function within its habitat.
