= Iarucanga capillacea =

Scientific classification
- Kingdom: Animalia
- Phylum: Arthropoda
- Class: Insecta
- Order: Coleoptera
- Suborder: Polyphaga
- Infraorder: Cucujiformia
- Family: Cerambycidae
- Genus: Iarucanga
- Species: I. capillacea

Binomial name
- Iarucanga capillacea (Bates, 1866)

Synonyms
- Hemilophus capillaceus Gemminger & Harold, 1873; Lycidola capillacea Bates, 1881; Spathoptera capillacea Bates, 1866

Species of beetle

Iarucanga capillacea is a species of beetle in the family Cerambycidae. It was described by Henry Walter Bates in 1866. It is known from Brazil.
