= Acasanga dimidiosanguinea =

Scientific classification
- Kingdom: Animalia
- Phylum: Arthropoda
- Class: Insecta
- Order: Coleoptera
- Suborder: Polyphaga
- Infraorder: Cucujiformia
- Family: Cerambycidae
- Genus: Acasanga
- Species: A. dimidiosanguinea

Binomial name
- Acasanga dimidiosanguinea (E. Fuchs, 1963)

Synonyms
- Themistonoe dimidiosanguinea E. Fuchs, 1963

Species of beetle

Acasanga dimidiosanguinea is a species of beetle in the family Cerambycidae. It was described by Ernst Fuchs in 1963. It is known from Colombia.
