= Iareonycha =

Scientific classification
- Kingdom: Animalia
- Phylum: Arthropoda
- Class: Insecta
- Order: Coleoptera
- Suborder: Polyphaga
- Infraorder: Cucujiformia
- Family: Cerambycidae
- Subfamily: Lamiinae
- Tribe: Hemilophini
- Genus: Iareonycha; Martins & Galileo, 1997

Genus of beetles

Iareonycha is a genus of longhorn beetles of the subfamily Lamiinae, containing the following species:

- Iareonycha albisterna Martins & Galileo, 2004
- Iareonycha ipepuna Martins & Galileo, 1997
