= Ibitiruna =

Scientific classification
- Kingdom: Animalia
- Phylum: Arthropoda
- Class: Insecta
- Order: Coleoptera
- Suborder: Polyphaga
- Infraorder: Cucujiformia
- Family: Cerambycidae
- Subfamily: Lamiinae
- Tribe: Hemilophini
- Genus: Ibitiruna; Galileo & Martins, 1997

Genus of beetles

Ibitiruna is a genus of longhorn beetles of the subfamily Lamiinae, containing the following species:

- Ibitiruna araponga Galileo & Martins, 1997
- Ibitiruna fenestrata (Bates, 1881)
