= Canarana seminigra =

Scientific classification
- Kingdom: Animalia
- Phylum: Arthropoda
- Class: Insecta
- Order: Coleoptera
- Suborder: Polyphaga
- Infraorder: Cucujiformia
- Family: Cerambycidae
- Genus: Canarana
- Species: C. seminigra

Binomial name
- Canarana seminigra (Bates, 1866)

Synonyms
- Amphionycha seminigra Bates, 1866; Hemilophus seminiger Gemminger & Harold, 1873; Hilarolea seminigra Bates, 1881

Species of beetle

Canarana seminigra is a species of beetle in the family Cerambycidae. It was described by Henry Walter Bates in 1866. It is known from Brazil.
