= Chrysaperda metallica =

Scientific classification
- Kingdom: Animalia
- Phylum: Arthropoda
- Class: Insecta
- Order: Coleoptera
- Suborder: Polyphaga
- Infraorder: Cucujiformia
- Family: Cerambycidae
- Genus: Chrysaperda
- Species: C. metallica

Binomial name
- Chrysaperda metallica Bates, 1881

Synonyms
- Amphionycha apicalis Kirsch, 1889

Species of beetle

Chrysaperda metallica is a species of beetle in the family Cerambycidae. It was described by Bates in 1881. It is known from Ecuador and Peru.
