= Purusiella =

Scientific classification
- Kingdom: Animalia
- Phylum: Arthropoda
- Class: Insecta
- Order: Coleoptera
- Suborder: Polyphaga
- Infraorder: Cucujiformia
- Family: Cerambycidae
- Subfamily: Lamiinae
- Tribe: Hemilophini
- Genus: Purusiella; Dalens, Touroult & Tavakilian, 2010

Genus of beetles

Purusiella is a genus of longhorn beetles of the subfamily Lamiinae, containing the following species:

- Purusiella hippomontanensis Dalens, Touroult & Tavakilian, 2010
- Purusiella wappesi (Martins & Galileo, 2004)
