= Gagarinia =

Scientific classification
- Kingdom: Animalia
- Phylum: Arthropoda
- Class: Insecta
- Order: Coleoptera
- Suborder: Polyphaga
- Infraorder: Cucujiformia
- Family: Cerambycidae
- Subfamily: Lamiinae
- Tribe: Hemilophini
- Genus: Gagarinia; Lane, 1956

Genus of beetles

Gagarinia is a genus of longhorn beetles of the subfamily Lamiinae, containing the following species:

- Gagarinia aureolata (Lane, 1950)
- Gagarinia borgmeieri (Bondar, 1938)
- Gagarinia melasma Galileo & Martins, 2004
- Gagarinia mniszechii (Chabrillac, 1857)
