= Mariliana =

Scientific classification
- Kingdom: Animalia
- Phylum: Arthropoda
- Class: Insecta
- Order: Coleoptera
- Suborder: Polyphaga
- Infraorder: Cucujiformia
- Family: Cerambycidae
- Subfamily: Lamiinae
- Tribe: Hemilophini
- Genus: Mariliana; Lane, 1970

Genus of beetles

Mariliana is a genus of longhorn beetles of the subfamily Lamiinae, containing the following species:

- Mariliana amazonica Galileo & Martins, 2004
- Mariliana cicadellida Galileo & Martins, 2004
- Mariliana hovorei Galileo & Martins, 2005
- Mariliana niveopicta Lane, 1970
- Mariliana ocularis (Hope, 1846)
- Mariliana rupicola Lane, 1970
- Mariliana sumpta Lane, 1970
