= Cendiuna pataiuna =

Scientific classification
- Kingdom: Animalia
- Phylum: Arthropoda
- Class: Insecta
- Order: Coleoptera
- Suborder: Polyphaga
- Infraorder: Cucujiformia
- Family: Cerambycidae
- Genus: Cendiuna
- Species: C. pataiuna

Binomial name
- Cendiuna pataiuna Galileo & Martins, 1991

Species of beetle

Cendiuna pataiuna is a species of beetle in the family Cerambycidae. It was described by Galileo and Martins in 1991. It is known from Brazil.
