= Cotyadesmus brunneus =

Scientific classification
- Kingdom: Animalia
- Phylum: Arthropoda
- Class: Insecta
- Order: Coleoptera
- Suborder: Polyphaga
- Infraorder: Cucujiformia
- Family: Cerambycidae
- Genus: Cotyadesmus
- Species: C. brunneus

Binomial name
- Cotyadesmus brunneus (Aurivillius, 1923)

Species of beetle

Cotyadesmus brunneus is a species of beetle in the family Cerambycidae. It was described by Per Olof Christopher Aurivillius in 1923 and is known from Colombia.
