= Canarana exotica =

Scientific classification
- Kingdom: Animalia
- Phylum: Arthropoda
- Class: Insecta
- Order: Coleoptera
- Suborder: Polyphaga
- Infraorder: Cucujiformia
- Family: Cerambycidae
- Genus: Canarana
- Species: C. exotica

Binomial name
- Canarana exotica Galileo & Martins, 2001

Species of beetle

Canarana exotica is a species of beetle in the family Cerambycidae. It was described by Galileo and Martins in 2001. It is known from Ecuador.
