= Canarana brachialis =

Scientific classification
- Kingdom: Animalia
- Phylum: Arthropoda
- Class: Insecta
- Order: Coleoptera
- Suborder: Polyphaga
- Infraorder: Cucujiformia
- Family: Cerambycidae
- Genus: Canarana
- Species: C. brachialis

Binomial name
- Canarana brachialis (Guérin-Méneville, 1855)

Synonyms
- Adesmus brachialis Aurivillius, 1923; Amphionycha brachialis Bates, 1881; Hemilophus brachialis Guérin-Méneville, 1855; Hilarolea brachialis Soukup, 1942; Hilarolea croceicollis Gahan, 1889; Spathoptera brachialis Thomson, 1878

Species of beetle

Canarana brachialis is a species of beetle in the family Cerambycidae. It was described by Félix Édouard Guérin-Méneville in 1855. It is known from Bolivia, Brazil, Peru and Ecuador.
