= Arixiuna =

Scientific classification
- Kingdom: Animalia
- Phylum: Arthropoda
- Class: Insecta
- Order: Coleoptera
- Suborder: Polyphaga
- Infraorder: Cucujiformia
- Family: Cerambycidae
- Subfamily: Lamiinae
- Tribe: Hemilophini
- Genus: Arixiuna; Martins & Galileo, 1992

Genus of beetles

Arixiuna is a genus of longhorn beetles of the subfamily Lamiinae, containing the following species:

- Arixiuna longula (Bates, 1881)
- Arixiuna prolixa (Bates, 1872)
- Arixiuna varians (Bates, 1881)
