= Chrysaperda =

Scientific classification
- Kingdom: Animalia
- Phylum: Arthropoda
- Class: Insecta
- Order: Coleoptera
- Suborder: Polyphaga
- Infraorder: Cucujiformia
- Family: Cerambycidae
- Subfamily: Lamiinae
- Tribe: Hemilophini
- Genus: Chrysaperda; Bates, 1881

Genus of beetles

Chrysaperda is a genus of longhorn beetles of the subfamily Lamiinae, containing the following species:

- Chrysaperda circumcincta (Pascoe, 1859)
- Chrysaperda collaris Pascoe, 1888
- Chrysaperda metallica Bates, 1881
