= Calocosmus nigripennis =

Scientific classification
- Kingdom: Animalia
- Phylum: Arthropoda
- Clade: Pancrustacea
- Class: Insecta
- Order: Coleoptera
- Suborder: Polyphaga
- Infraorder: Cucujiformia
- Family: Cerambycidae
- Genus: Calocosmus
- Species: C. nigripennis

Binomial name
- Calocosmus nigripennis Chevrolat, 1862

Species of beetle

Calocosmus nigripennis is a species of beetle in the family Cerambycidae. It was described by Chevrolat in 1862. It is known from Cuba.
