= Lapazina =

Scientific classification
- Kingdom: Animalia
- Phylum: Arthropoda
- Class: Insecta
- Order: Coleoptera
- Suborder: Polyphaga
- Infraorder: Cucujiformia
- Family: Cerambycidae
- Subfamily: Lamiinae
- Tribe: Hemilophini
- Genus: Lapazina; Lane, 1973

Genus of beetles

Lapazina is a genus of longhorn beetles of the subfamily Lamiinae, containing the following species:

- Lapazina discicollis (Bates, 1881)
- Lapazina fuscipennis (Bates, 1881)
