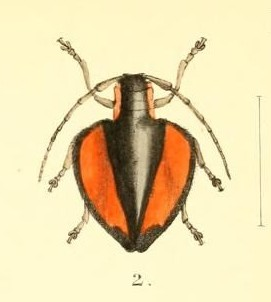
- Ites plagiatus

Scientific classification
- Domain: Eukaryota
- Kingdom: Animalia
- Phylum: Arthropoda
- Class: Insecta
- Order: Coleoptera
- Suborder: Polyphaga
- Infraorder: Cucujiformia
- Family: Cerambycidae
- Tribe: Hemilophini
- Genus: Ites; Waterhouse, 1880

Synonyms
- Lycodesmus Melzer, 1927

= Ites =

Genus of beetles

Ites is a genus of longhorn beetles of the subfamily Lamiinae, containing the following species:

- Ites colasi Lepesme, 1943
- Ites plagiatus Waterhouse, 1880
