= Mariliana amazonica =

Scientific classification
- Kingdom: Animalia
- Phylum: Arthropoda
- Class: Insecta
- Order: Coleoptera
- Suborder: Polyphaga
- Infraorder: Cucujiformia
- Family: Cerambycidae
- Genus: Mariliana
- Species: M. amazonica

Binomial name
- Mariliana amazonica Galileo & Martins, 2004

Species of beetle

Mariliana amazonica is a species of beetle in the family Cerambycidae. It was described by Galileo and Martins in 2004. It is known from French Guiana.
