= Cotycuara =

Scientific classification
- Kingdom: Animalia
- Phylum: Arthropoda
- Class: Insecta
- Order: Coleoptera
- Suborder: Polyphaga
- Infraorder: Cucujiformia
- Family: Cerambycidae
- Subfamily: Lamiinae
- Tribe: Hemilophini
- Genus: Cotycuara; Galileo & Martins, 2004

Genus of beetles

Cotycuara is a genus of longhorn beetles of the subfamily Lamiinae, containing the following species:

- Cotycuara albomarginata Galileo & Martins, 2004
- Cotycuara crinita Galileo & Martins, 2005
- Cotycuara viridis Galileo & Martins, 2005
