= Parauna zikani =

Scientific classification
- Kingdom: Animalia
- Phylum: Arthropoda
- Class: Insecta
- Order: Coleoptera
- Suborder: Polyphaga
- Infraorder: Cucujiformia
- Family: Cerambycidae
- Subfamily: Lamiinae
- Tribe: Hemilophini
- Genus: Parauna
- Species: P. zikani

Binomial name
- Parauna zikani Lane, 1972

Species of beetles

Parauna zikani is a species of long-horned beetle in the family Cerambycidae, the sole species of the genus Parauna. It is found in Brazil and French Guiana.
