= Piruanycha =

Scientific classification
- Domain: Eukaryota
- Kingdom: Animalia
- Phylum: Arthropoda
- Class: Insecta
- Order: Coleoptera
- Suborder: Polyphaga
- Infraorder: Cucujiformia
- Family: Cerambycidae
- Tribe: Hemilophini
- Genus: Piruanycha

Genus of beetles

Piruanycha is a genus of longhorn beetles of the subfamily Lamiinae, containing the following species:

- Piruanycha itaiuba Martins & Galileo, 1997
- Piruanycha ocoa Martins & Galileo, 1997
- Piruanycha pitilla Galileo & Martins, 2005
