= Acaiatuca =

Scientific classification
- Domain: Eukaryota
- Kingdom: Animalia
- Phylum: Arthropoda
- Class: Insecta
- Order: Coleoptera
- Suborder: Polyphaga
- Infraorder: Cucujiformia
- Family: Cerambycidae
- Tribe: Hemilophini
- Genus: Acaiatuca; Martins & Galileo, 1992

Genus of beetles

Acaiatuca is a genus of longhorn beetles of the subfamily Lamiinae, containing the following species:

- Acaiatuca denudata Galileo & Martins, 2001
- Acaiatuca quadricostata (Tippmann, 1953)
