= Purusia =

Scientific classification
- Domain: Eukaryota
- Kingdom: Animalia
- Phylum: Arthropoda
- Class: Insecta
- Order: Coleoptera
- Suborder: Polyphaga
- Infraorder: Cucujiformia
- Family: Cerambycidae
- Tribe: Hemilophini
- Genus: Purusia

Genus of beetles

Purusia is a genus of longhorn beetles of the subfamily Lamiinae, containing the following species:

- Purusia acreana Lane, 1956
- Purusia wappesi Martins & Galileo, 2004
