= Cotyadesmus =

Scientific classification
- Kingdom: Animalia
- Phylum: Arthropoda
- Class: Insecta
- Order: Coleoptera
- Suborder: Polyphaga
- Infraorder: Cucujiformia
- Family: Cerambycidae
- Subfamily: Lamiinae
- Tribe: Hemilophini
- Genus: Cotyadesmus; Martins & Galileo, 2005

Genus of beetles

Cotyadesmus is a genus of longhorn beetles of the subfamily Lamiinae, containing the following species:

- Cotyadesmus brunneus (Aurivillius, 1923)
- Cotyadesmus iuba (Galileo & Martins, 2003)
