= Purusiella wappesi =

Scientific classification
- Kingdom: Animalia
- Phylum: Arthropoda
- Class: Insecta
- Order: Coleoptera
- Suborder: Polyphaga
- Infraorder: Cucujiformia
- Family: Cerambycidae
- Genus: Purusiella
- Species: P. wappesi

Binomial name
- Purusiella wappesi (Martins & Galileo, 2004)

Species of beetle

Purusiella wappesi is a species of beetle in the family Cerambycidae. It was described by Martins and Galileo in 2004. It is known from Bolivia.
