= Calocosmus marginipennis =

Scientific classification
- Kingdom: Animalia
- Phylum: Arthropoda
- Class: Insecta
- Order: Coleoptera
- Suborder: Polyphaga
- Infraorder: Cucujiformia
- Family: Cerambycidae
- Genus: Calocosmus
- Species: C. marginipennis

Binomial name
- Calocosmus marginipennis Gahan, 1889

Species of beetle

Calocosmus marginipennis is a species of beetle in the family Cerambycidae. It was described by Gahan in 1889. It is known from Jamaica.
