= Calocosmus semimarginatus =

Scientific classification
- Kingdom: Animalia
- Phylum: Arthropoda
- Clade: Pancrustacea
- Class: Insecta
- Order: Coleoptera
- Suborder: Polyphaga
- Infraorder: Cucujiformia
- Family: Cerambycidae
- Genus: Calocosmus
- Species: C. semimarginatus

Binomial name
- Calocosmus semimarginatus Bates, 1881

Synonyms
- Hemilophus semimarginatus Lameere, 1883

Species of beetle

Calocosmus semimarginatus is a species of beetle in the family Cerambycidae. It was described by Bates in 1881. It is known from Cuba.
