= Eulachnesia cobaltina =

Scientific classification
- Kingdom: Animalia
- Phylum: Arthropoda
- Class: Insecta
- Order: Coleoptera
- Suborder: Polyphaga
- Infraorder: Cucujiformia
- Family: Cerambycidae
- Genus: Eulachnesia
- Species: E. cobaltina

Binomial name
- Eulachnesia cobaltina Bates, 1881

Species of beetle

Eulachnesia cobaltina is a species of beetle in the family Cerambycidae. It was described by Bates in 1881. It is known from Colombia.
