= Cuicirama =

Scientific classification
- Domain: Eukaryota
- Kingdom: Animalia
- Phylum: Arthropoda
- Class: Insecta
- Order: Coleoptera
- Suborder: Polyphaga
- Infraorder: Cucujiformia
- Family: Cerambycidae
- Tribe: Hemilophini
- Genus: Cuicirama

Genus of beetles

Cuicirama is a genus of longhorn beetles of the subfamily Lamiinae, containing the following species:

- Cuicirama cayennensis (Bates, 1881)
- Cuicirama fasciata (Bates, 1866)
- Cuicirama smithii (Bates, 1881)
- Cuicirama spectabilis (Blanchard, 1843)
