= Chrysaperda circumcincta =

Scientific classification
- Kingdom: Animalia
- Phylum: Arthropoda
- Class: Insecta
- Order: Coleoptera
- Suborder: Polyphaga
- Infraorder: Cucujiformia
- Family: Cerambycidae
- Genus: Chrysaperda
- Species: C. circumcincta

Binomial name
- Chrysaperda circumcincta (Pascoe, 1859)

Synonyms
- Amphionycha circumcincta Pascoe, 1859; Hemilophus circumcinctus Gemminger & Harold, 1873

Species of beetle

Chrysaperda circumcincta is a species of beetle in the family Cerambycidae. It was described by Pascoe in 1859. It is known from Brazil.
