= Itaituba (beetle) =

Scientific classification
- Domain: Eukaryota
- Kingdom: Animalia
- Phylum: Arthropoda
- Class: Insecta
- Order: Coleoptera
- Suborder: Polyphaga
- Infraorder: Cucujiformia
- Family: Cerambycidae
- Subfamily: Lamiinae
- Tribe: Hemilophini
- Genus: Itaituba; Lane, 1950

Genus of beetles

Itaituba is a genus of longhorn beetles of the subfamily Lamiinae, containing the following species:

- Itaituba miniacea (Bates, 1866)
- Itaituba pitanga Galileo & Martins, 1991
