= Cendiuna planipennis =

Scientific classification
- Kingdom: Animalia
- Phylum: Arthropoda
- Class: Insecta
- Order: Coleoptera
- Suborder: Polyphaga
- Infraorder: Cucujiformia
- Family: Cerambycidae
- Genus: Cendiuna
- Species: C. planipennis

Binomial name
- Cendiuna planipennis (Bates, 1881)

Synonyms
- Alampyris planipennis Bates, 1881

Species of beetle

Cendiuna planipennis is a species of beetle in the family Cerambycidae. It was described by Henry Walter Bates in 1881. It is known from Brazil.
