= Acasanga delectabilis =

Scientific classification
- Kingdom: Animalia
- Phylum: Arthropoda
- Class: Insecta
- Order: Coleoptera
- Suborder: Polyphaga
- Infraorder: Cucujiformia
- Family: Cerambycidae
- Genus: Acasanga
- Species: A. delectabilis

Binomial name
- Acasanga delectabilis (Waterhouse, 1880)

Synonyms
- Hemilophus delectabilis Lameere, 1883; Themistonoë delectabilis Waterhouse, 1880; Themistonoe delectabilis Bates, 1881

Species of beetle

Acasanga delectabilis is a species of beetle in the family Cerambycidae. It was described by Waterhouse in 1880.
