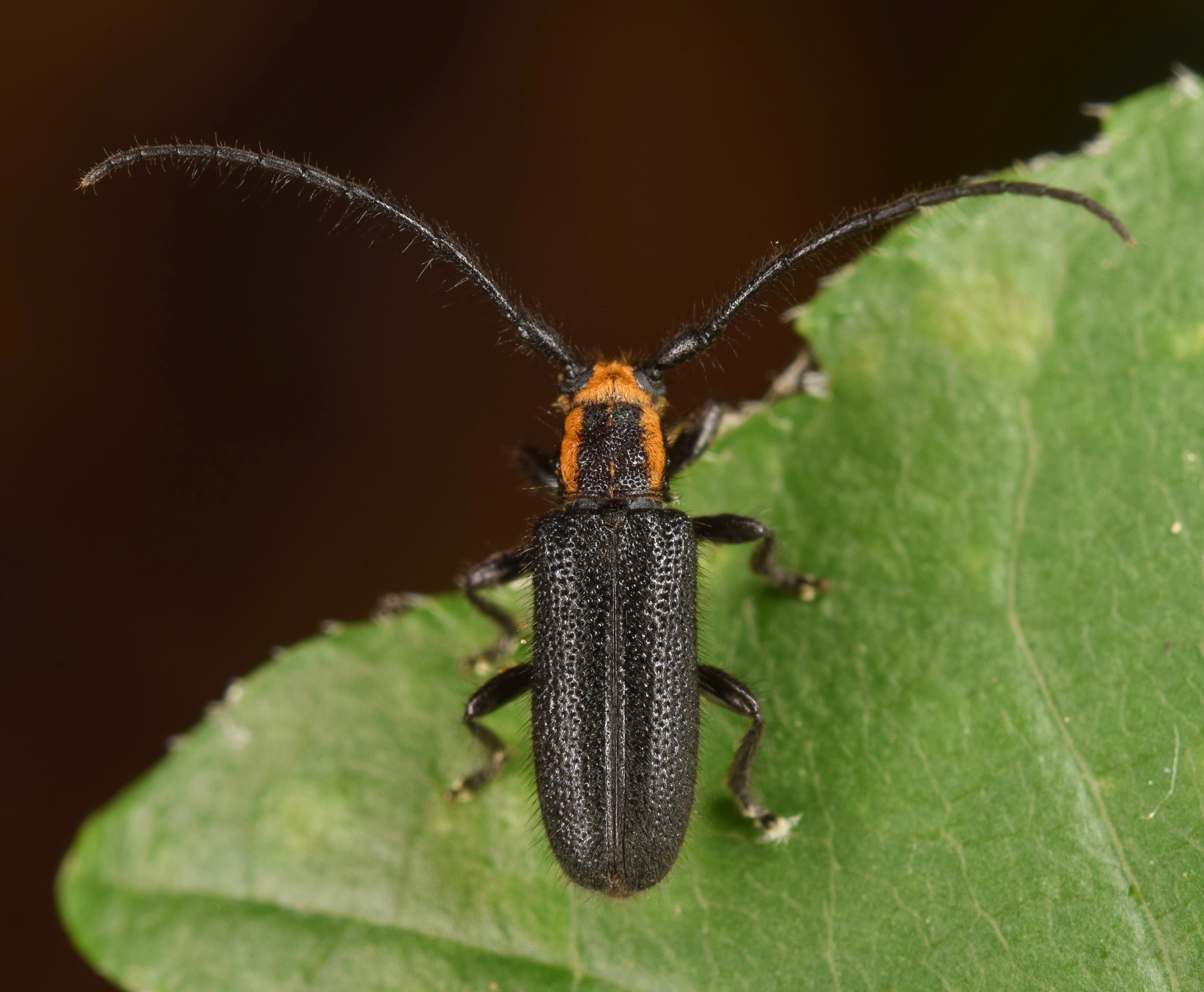

Scientific classification
- Kingdom: Animalia
- Phylum: Arthropoda
- Clade: Pancrustacea
- Class: Insecta
- Order: Coleoptera
- Suborder: Polyphaga
- Infraorder: Cucujiformia
- Family: Cerambycidae
- Genus: Hemierana
- Species: H. marginata

Binomial name
- Hemierana marginata (Fabricius, 1798)

= Hemierana marginata =

Genus of beetles

Hemierana marginata is a species of beetle in the family Cerambycidae. It was described by Johan Christian Fabricius in 1798.
