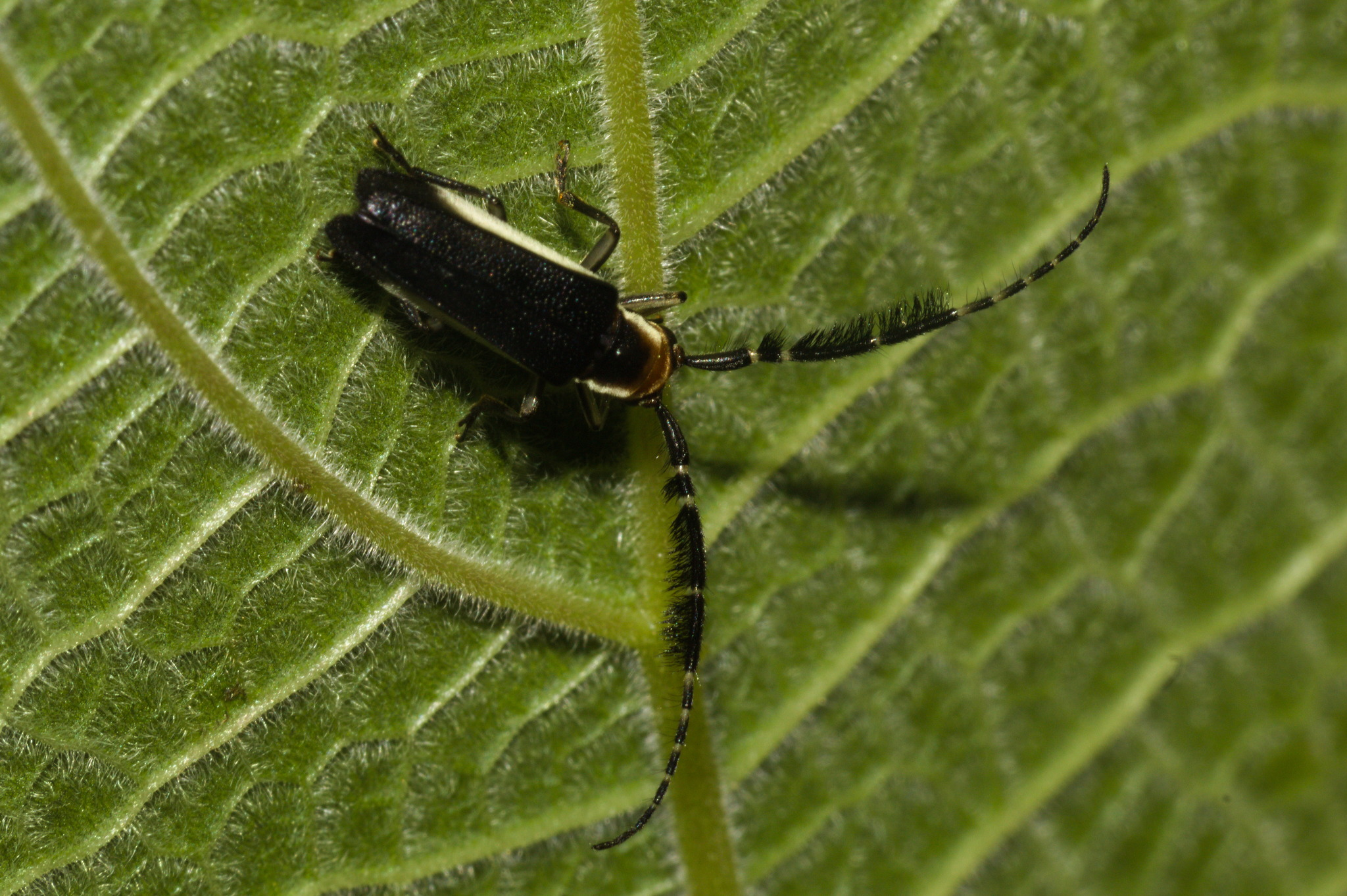
- Hemilophus leucogramma

Scientific classification
- Domain: Eukaryota
- Kingdom: Animalia
- Phylum: Arthropoda
- Class: Insecta
- Order: Coleoptera
- Suborder: Polyphaga
- Infraorder: Cucujiformia
- Family: Cerambycidae
- Subfamily: Lamiinae
- Tribe: Hemilophini
- Genus: Hemilophus; Lane, 1970

= Hemilophus =

Genus of beetles

Hemilophus is a genus of longhorn beetles of the subfamily Lamiinae, containing the following species:

- Hemilophus dimidiaticornis Audinet-Serville, 1835
- Hemilophus infuscatus Bates, 1881
- Hemilophus leucogrammus Bates, 1881
- Hemilophus unicolor Bates, 1881
