= Murupeaca =

Scientific classification
- Kingdom: Animalia
- Phylum: Arthropoda
- Class: Insecta
- Order: Coleoptera
- Suborder: Polyphaga
- Infraorder: Cucujiformia
- Family: Cerambycidae
- Subfamily: Lamiinae
- Tribe: Hemilophini
- Genus: Murupeaca; Martins & Galileo, 1992

Genus of beetles

Murupeaca is a genus of longhorn beetles of the subfamily Lamiinae, containing the following species:

- Murupeaca mocoia Martins & Galileo, 1993
- Murupeaca pinimatinga Martins & Galileo, 1992
- Murupeaca tavakiliani Galileo & Martins, 2004
