= Iquiara =

Scientific classification
- Kingdom: Animalia
- Phylum: Arthropoda
- Class: Insecta
- Order: Coleoptera
- Suborder: Polyphaga
- Infraorder: Cucujiformia
- Family: Cerambycidae
- Subfamily: Lamiinae
- Tribe: Hemilophini
- Genus: Iquiara; Martins & Galileo, 1998
- Species: I. tuiuca

Binomial name
- Iquiara tuiuca Martins & Galileo, 1998

Genus of beetles

Iquiara tuiuca is a species of beetle in the family Cerambycidae, and the only species in the genus Iquiara. It was described by Martins and Galileo in 1998.
