= Cacupira iodina =

Scientific classification
- Kingdom: Animalia
- Phylum: Arthropoda
- Class: Insecta
- Order: Coleoptera
- Suborder: Polyphaga
- Infraorder: Cucujiformia
- Family: Cerambycidae
- Genus: Cacupira
- Species: C. iodina

Binomial name
- Cacupira iodina (Bates, 1881)

Synonyms
- Hemilophus iodinus Lameere, 1883; Malacoscylus iodinus Bates, 1881

Species of beetle

Cacupira iodina is a species of beetle in the family Cerambycidae. It was described by Henry Walter Bates in 1881. It is known from Ecuador.
