= Calocosmus hispaniolae =

Scientific classification
- Kingdom: Animalia
- Phylum: Arthropoda
- Class: Insecta
- Order: Coleoptera
- Suborder: Polyphaga
- Infraorder: Cucujiformia
- Family: Cerambycidae
- Genus: Calocosmus
- Species: C. hispaniolae

Binomial name
- Calocosmus hispaniolae Fisher, 1925

Species of beetle

Calocosmus hispaniolae is a species of beetle in the family Cerambycidae. It was described by Fisher in 1925. It is known from the Dominican Republic.
