= Murupeaca tavakiliani =

Scientific classification
- Kingdom: Animalia
- Phylum: Arthropoda
- Class: Insecta
- Order: Coleoptera
- Suborder: Polyphaga
- Infraorder: Cucujiformia
- Family: Cerambycidae
- Genus: Murupeaca
- Species: M. tavakiliani

Binomial name
- Murupeaca tavakiliani Galileo & Martins, 2004

Species of beetle

Murupeaca tavakiliani is a species of beetle in the family Cerambycidae. It was described by Galileo and Martins in 2004. It is known from French Guiana.
