= Hemiloapis yandaira =

Scientific classification
- Kingdom: Animalia
- Phylum: Arthropoda
- Class: Insecta
- Order: Coleoptera
- Suborder: Polyphaga
- Infraorder: Cucujiformia
- Family: Cerambycidae
- Genus: Hemiloapis
- Species: H. yandaira

Binomial name
- Hemiloapis yandaira Galileo & Martins, 2004

Species of beetle

Hemiloapis yandaira is a species of beetle in the family Cerambycidae. It was described by Galileo and Martins in 2004. It is known from Bolivia.
