= Calocosmus nigritarsis =

Scientific classification
- Kingdom: Animalia
- Phylum: Arthropoda
- Class: Insecta
- Order: Coleoptera
- Suborder: Polyphaga
- Infraorder: Cucujiformia
- Family: Cerambycidae
- Genus: Calocosmus
- Species: C. nigritarsis

Binomial name
- Calocosmus nigritarsis Fisher, 1942

Species of beetle

Calocosmus nigritarsis is a species of beetle in the family Cerambycidae. It was described by Fisher in 1942. It is known from the Dominican Republic.
