= Purusiella hippomontanensis =

Scientific classification
- Kingdom: Animalia
- Phylum: Arthropoda
- Class: Insecta
- Order: Coleoptera
- Suborder: Polyphaga
- Infraorder: Cucujiformia
- Family: Cerambycidae
- Genus: Purusiella
- Species: P. hippomontanensis

Binomial name
- Purusiella hippomontanensis Dalens, Touroult & Tavakilian, 2010

Species of beetle

Purusiella hippomontanensis is a species of beetle in the family Cerambycidae. It was described by Dalens, Touroult and Tavakilian in 2010. It is known from French Guiana.
