= Acasanga =

Scientific classification
- Kingdom: Animalia
- Phylum: Arthropoda
- Class: Insecta
- Order: Coleoptera
- Suborder: Polyphaga
- Infraorder: Cucujiformia
- Family: Cerambycidae
- Subfamily: Lamiinae
- Tribe: Hemilophini
- Genus: Acasanga; Martins & Galileo, 1991

Genus of beetles

Acasanga is a genus of longhorn beetles of the subfamily Lamiinae, containing the following species:

- Acasanga delectabilis (Waterhouse, 1880)
- Acasanga dimidiosanguinea (Fuchs, 1963)
- Acasanga humeralis (Waterhouse, 1880)
- Acasanga reticulata (Waterhouse, 1880)
