= Tabatinga x-littera =

Scientific classification
- Kingdom: Animalia
- Phylum: Arthropoda
- Class: Insecta
- Order: Coleoptera
- Suborder: Polyphaga
- Infraorder: Cucujiformia
- Family: Cerambycidae
- Tribe: Hemilophini
- Genus: Tabatinga; Lane, 1966
- Species: T. x-littera

Binomial name
- Tabatinga x-littera Lane, 1966

Species of beetle

Tabatinga x-littera is a species of beetle in the family Cerambycidae, and the only species in the genus Tabatinga. It is found in Brazil.
