= Cephalodina capito =

Scientific classification
- Kingdom: Animalia
- Phylum: Arthropoda
- Class: Insecta
- Order: Coleoptera
- Suborder: Polyphaga
- Infraorder: Cucujiformia
- Family: Cerambycidae
- Genus: Cephalodina
- Species: C. capito

Binomial name
- Cephalodina capito (Bates, 1866)

Synonyms
- Amphionycha capito Bates, 1866; Hemilophus capito Gemminger & Harold, 1873

Species of beetle

Cephalodina capito is a species of beetle in the family Cerambycidae. It was described by Bates in 1866. It is known from Costa Rica and Panama.
