= Lapazina discicollis =

Scientific classification
- Kingdom: Animalia
- Phylum: Arthropoda
- Class: Insecta
- Order: Coleoptera
- Suborder: Polyphaga
- Infraorder: Cucujiformia
- Family: Cerambycidae
- Genus: Lapazina
- Species: L. discicollis

Binomial name
- Lapazina discicollis (Bates, 1881)

Synonyms
- Adesmus discicollis Aurivillius, 1923; Amphionycha discicollis Bates, 1881; Hemilophus discicollis Lameere, 1883

Species of beetle

Lapazina discicollis is a species of beetle in the family Cerambycidae. It was described by Henry Walter Bates in 1881. It is known from Ecuador.
