= Cotycuara albomarginata =

Scientific classification
- Kingdom: Animalia
- Phylum: Arthropoda
- Class: Insecta
- Order: Coleoptera
- Suborder: Polyphaga
- Infraorder: Cucujiformia
- Family: Cerambycidae
- Genus: Cotycuara
- Species: C. albomarginata

Binomial name
- Cotycuara albomarginata Galileo & Martins, 2004

Species of beetle

Cotycuara albomarginata is a species of beetle in the family Cerambycidae. It was described by Galileo and Martins in 2004. It is known from Costa Rica and Panama.
