= Calocosmus contortus =

Scientific classification
- Kingdom: Animalia
- Phylum: Arthropoda
- Class: Insecta
- Order: Coleoptera
- Suborder: Polyphaga
- Infraorder: Cucujiformia
- Family: Cerambycidae
- Genus: Calocosmus
- Species: C. contortus

Binomial name
- Calocosmus contortus Lingafelter, 2013

Species of beetle

Calocosmus contortus is a species of beetle in the family Cerambycidae. It was described by Lingafelter in 2013. The species, whose genus is endemic to the West Indies, was identified on Hispaniola.
