= Cotyadesmus iuba =

Scientific classification
- Kingdom: Animalia
- Phylum: Arthropoda
- Class: Insecta
- Order: Coleoptera
- Suborder: Polyphaga
- Infraorder: Cucujiformia
- Family: Cerambycidae
- Genus: Cotyadesmus
- Species: C. iuba

Binomial name
- Cotyadesmus iuba (Galileo & Martins, 2003)

Species of beetle

Cotyadesmus iuba is a species of beetle in the family Cerambycidae. It was described by Galileo and Martins in 2003. It is known from Colombia.
