= Eulachnesia monnei =

Scientific classification
- Kingdom: Animalia
- Phylum: Arthropoda
- Class: Insecta
- Order: Coleoptera
- Suborder: Polyphaga
- Infraorder: Cucujiformia
- Family: Cerambycidae
- Genus: Eulachnesia
- Species: E. monnei

Binomial name
- Eulachnesia monnei Martins & Galileo, 1996

Species of beetle

Eulachnesia monnei is a species of beetle in the family Cerambycidae. It was described by Martins and Galileo in 1996. It is known from Brazil.
