= Lapazina fuscipennis =

Scientific classification
- Kingdom: Animalia
- Phylum: Arthropoda
- Class: Insecta
- Order: Coleoptera
- Suborder: Polyphaga
- Infraorder: Cucujiformia
- Family: Cerambycidae
- Genus: Lapazina
- Species: L. fuscipennis

Binomial name
- Lapazina fuscipennis (Bates, 1881)

Synonyms
- Adesmus fuscipennis Aurivillius, 1923; Amphionycha fuscipennis Bates, 1881; Hemilophus fuscipennis Lameere, 1883

Species of beetle

Lapazina fuscipennis is a species of beetle in the family Cerambycidae. It was described by Henry Walter Bates in 1881. It is known from Bolivia and Peru.
