= Acasanga reticulata =

Scientific classification
- Kingdom: Animalia
- Phylum: Arthropoda
- Class: Insecta
- Order: Coleoptera
- Suborder: Polyphaga
- Infraorder: Cucujiformia
- Family: Cerambycidae
- Genus: Acasanga
- Species: A. reticulata

Binomial name
- Acasanga reticulata (Waterhouse, 1880)

Synonyms
- Hemilophus reticulatus Lameere, 1883; Themistonoe reticulata Bates, 1881; Themistonoë reticulata Waterhouse, 1880; Themnistonoe reticulata Linsley, 1961

Species of beetle

Acasanga reticulata is a species of beetle in the family Cerambycidae. It was described by Waterhouse in 1880. It is known from Ecuador.
