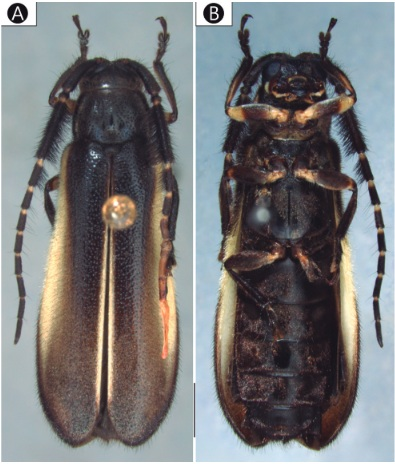

Scientific classification
- Kingdom: Animalia
- Phylum: Arthropoda
- Clade: Pancrustacea
- Class: Insecta
- Order: Coleoptera
- Suborder: Polyphaga
- Infraorder: Cucujiformia
- Family: Cerambycidae
- Genus: Cendiuna
- Species: C. migueli

Binomial name
- Cendiuna migueli Silva Junior, Souza & Machado, 2026

= Cendiuna migueli =

Species of beetle

Cendiuna migueli is a species of beetle of the family Cerambycidae. It is found in Brazil (Paraná).

== Description ==
Adults reach a length of about 14.02 mm (0.552 in). The head and pronotum are mostly dark. Antennomeres III-IV have fringes of black dense setae on the inner face, and III also has dense black setae on outer face. Antennomere III is more than two times longer than IV. The prothorax is strongly transverse, about one and a half times wider than long. Ventrite V has a transverse mark delimiting a slight slope at the mid-posterior portion.

== Etymology ==
The species is dedicated to Dr. Miguel A. Monné.
