= Iarucanga =

Scientific classification
- Kingdom: Animalia
- Phylum: Arthropoda
- Class: Insecta
- Order: Coleoptera
- Suborder: Polyphaga
- Infraorder: Cucujiformia
- Family: Cerambycidae
- Subfamily: Lamiinae
- Tribe: Hemilophini
- Genus: Iarucanga; Martins & Galileo, 1991

Genus of beetles

Iarucanga is a genus of longhorn beetles of the subfamily Lamiinae, containing the following species:

- Iarucanga capillacea (Bates, 1866)
- Iarucanga mimica (Bates, 1866)
