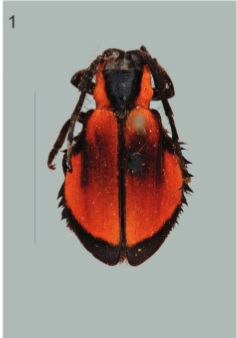

Scientific classification
- Kingdom: Animalia
- Phylum: Arthropoda
- Class: Insecta
- Order: Coleoptera
- Suborder: Polyphaga
- Infraorder: Cucujiformia
- Family: Cerambycidae
- Genus: Ites
- Species: I. colasi

Binomial name
- Ites colasi Lepesme, 1943

Synonyms
- Ites chaparensis Tippmann, 1960

= Ites colasi =

Species of beetle

Ites colasi is a species of beetle in the family Cerambycidae. It was described by Lepesme in 1943. It is known from French Guiana.
