= Juninia =

Scientific classification
- Kingdom: Animalia
- Phylum: Arthropoda
- Class: Insecta
- Order: Coleoptera
- Suborder: Polyphaga
- Infraorder: Cucujiformia
- Family: Cerambycidae
- Tribe: Hemilophini
- Genus: Juninia; Lane, 1966
- Species: J. annulifera

Binomial name
- Juninia annulifera (Kirsch, 1889)

Genus of beetles

Juninia is a monotypic beetle genus in the family Cerambycidae described by Lane in 1966. Its only species, Juninia annulifera, was described by Theodor Franz Wilhelm Kirsch in 1889.
