= Cephalodina acangassu =

Scientific classification
- Kingdom: Animalia
- Phylum: Arthropoda
- Class: Insecta
- Order: Coleoptera
- Suborder: Polyphaga
- Infraorder: Cucujiformia
- Family: Cerambycidae
- Genus: Cephalodina
- Species: C. acangassu

Binomial name
- Cephalodina acangassu Martins & Galileo, 1993

Species of beetle

Cephalodina acangassu is a species of beetle in the family Cerambycidae. It was described by Martins and Galileo in 1993. It is known from Ecuador.
