= Acabanga =

Scientific classification
- Kingdom: Animalia
- Phylum: Arthropoda
- Class: Insecta
- Order: Coleoptera
- Suborder: Polyphaga
- Infraorder: Cucujiformia
- Family: Cerambycidae
- Tribe: Hemilophini
- Genus: Acabanga; Martins & Galileo, 1991

Genus of beetles

Acabanga is a genus of longhorn beetles of the subfamily Lamiinae, containing the following species:

- Acabanga nigrohumeralis (Tippmann, 1960)
- Acabanga pinima Martins & Galileo, 1991
