= Cendiuna =

Scientific classification
- Kingdom: Animalia
- Phylum: Arthropoda
- Clade: Pancrustacea
- Class: Insecta
- Order: Coleoptera
- Suborder: Polyphaga
- Infraorder: Cucujiformia
- Family: Cerambycidae
- Subfamily: Lamiinae
- Tribe: Hemilophini
- Genus: Cendiuna; Galileo & Martins, 1991

Genus of beetles

Cendiuna is a genus of longhorn beetles of the subfamily Lamiinae, containing the following species:

- Cendiuna auauna Galileo & Martins, 1998
- Cendiuna cendira Galileo & Martins, 1991
- Cendiuna migueli Silva Junior, Souza & Machado, 2026
- Cendiuna pataiuna Galileo & Martins, 1991
- Cendiuna planipennis (Bates, 1881)
- Cendiuna puranga Galileo & Martins, 1991
