= Calocosmus magnificus =

Scientific classification
- Kingdom: Animalia
- Phylum: Arthropoda
- Class: Insecta
- Order: Coleoptera
- Suborder: Polyphaga
- Infraorder: Cucujiformia
- Family: Cerambycidae
- Genus: Calocosmus
- Species: C. magnificus

Binomial name
- Calocosmus magnificus Fisher, 1932

Species of beetle

Calocosmus magnificus is a species of beetle in the family Cerambycidae. It was described by Fisher in 1932. It is known from Haiti.
