= Calocosmus rawlinsi =

Scientific classification
- Kingdom: Animalia
- Phylum: Arthropoda
- Class: Insecta
- Order: Coleoptera
- Suborder: Polyphaga
- Infraorder: Cucujiformia
- Family: Cerambycidae
- Genus: Calocosmus
- Species: C. rawlinsi

Binomial name
- Calocosmus rawlinsi Lingafelter, 2013

Species of beetle

Calocosmus rawlinsi is a species of beetle in the family Cerambycidae. It was described by Lingafelter in 2013.
