= Mariliana rupicola =

Scientific classification
- Kingdom: Animalia
- Phylum: Arthropoda
- Class: Insecta
- Order: Coleoptera
- Suborder: Polyphaga
- Infraorder: Cucujiformia
- Family: Cerambycidae
- Genus: Mariliana
- Species: M. rupicola

Binomial name
- Mariliana rupicola Lane, 1970

Species of beetle

Mariliana rupicola is a species of beetle in the family Cerambycidae. It was described by Lane in 1970. It is known from Brazil.
