= Eulachnesia smaragdina =

Scientific classification
- Kingdom: Animalia
- Phylum: Arthropoda
- Class: Insecta
- Order: Coleoptera
- Suborder: Polyphaga
- Infraorder: Cucujiformia
- Family: Cerambycidae
- Genus: Eulachnesia
- Species: E. smaragdina

Binomial name
- Eulachnesia smaragdina Bates, 1872

Species of beetle

Eulachnesia smaragdina is a species of beetle in the family Cerambycidae. It was described by Bates in 1872. It is known from Panama and Nicaragua.
