= Egalicia =

Scientific classification
- Domain: Eukaryota
- Kingdom: Animalia
- Phylum: Arthropoda
- Class: Insecta
- Order: Coleoptera
- Suborder: Polyphaga
- Infraorder: Cucujiformia
- Family: Cerambycidae
- Tribe: Hemilophini
- Genus: Egalicia

Genus of beetles

Egalicia is a genus of longhorn beetles of the subfamily Lamiinae, containing the following species:

- Egalicia flavescens (Thomson, 1864)
- Egalicia testacea (Bates, 1866)
