= Chrysaperda collaris =

Scientific classification
- Kingdom: Animalia
- Phylum: Arthropoda
- Class: Insecta
- Order: Coleoptera
- Suborder: Polyphaga
- Infraorder: Cucujiformia
- Family: Cerambycidae
- Genus: Chrysaperda
- Species: C. collaris

Binomial name
- Chrysaperda collaris Pascoe, 1888

Species of beetle

Chrysaperda collaris is a species of beetle in the family Cerambycidae. It was described by Pascoe in 1888. It is known from Ecuador.
