= Calocosmus dimidiatus =

Scientific classification
- Kingdom: Animalia
- Phylum: Arthropoda
- Clade: Pancrustacea
- Class: Insecta
- Order: Coleoptera
- Suborder: Polyphaga
- Infraorder: Cucujiformia
- Family: Cerambycidae
- Genus: Calocosmus
- Species: C. dimidiatus

Binomial name
- Calocosmus dimidiatus (Chevrolat in Guérin-Méneville, 1838)

Synonyms
- Hemilophus dimidiata Thomson, 1857; Hemilophus dimidiatus Jacquelin du Val, 1857

Species of beetle

Calocosmus dimidiatus is a species of beetle in the family Cerambycidae. It was described by Chevrolat in 1838. It is known from Cuba.
