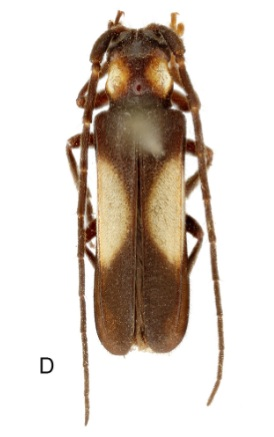

Scientific classification
- Kingdom: Animalia
- Phylum: Arthropoda
- Class: Insecta
- Order: Coleoptera
- Suborder: Polyphaga
- Infraorder: Cucujiformia
- Family: Cerambycidae
- Genus: Ibitiruna
- Species: I. fenestrata

Binomial name
- Ibitiruna fenestrata (Bates, 1881)

Synonyms
- Adesmus fenestratus Aurivillius, 1923; Amphionycha fenestrata Bates, 1881; Hemilophus fenestratus Lameere, 1883; Ibituruna fenestrata (Bates, 1881)

= Ibitiruna fenestrata =

Species of beetle

Ibitiruna fenestrata is a species of beetle in the family Cerambycidae. It was described by Henry Walter Bates in 1881. It is known from Brazil.
