= Canarana arguta =

Scientific classification
- Kingdom: Animalia
- Phylum: Arthropoda
- Class: Insecta
- Order: Coleoptera
- Suborder: Polyphaga
- Infraorder: Cucujiformia
- Family: Cerambycidae
- Genus: Canarana
- Species: C. arguta

Binomial name
- Canarana arguta Martins & Galileo, 2008

Species of beetle

Canarana arguta is a species of beetle in the family Cerambycidae. It was described by Martins and Galileo in 2008. It is known from Brazil.
