= Canarana tuberculicollis =

Scientific classification
- Kingdom: Animalia
- Phylum: Arthropoda
- Class: Insecta
- Order: Coleoptera
- Suborder: Polyphaga
- Infraorder: Cucujiformia
- Family: Cerambycidae
- Genus: Canarana
- Species: C. tuberculicollis

Binomial name
- Canarana tuberculicollis (Guérin-Méneville, 1855)

Synonyms
- Hemilophus tuberculicollis Guérin-Méneville, 1855; Hilarolea tuberculicollis Bates, 1881

Species of beetle

Canarana tuberculicollis is a species of beetle in the family Cerambycidae. It was described by Félix Édouard Guérin-Méneville in 1855. It is known from Ecuador, Brazil and Peru.
