= Calocosmus =

Scientific classification
- Kingdom: Animalia
- Phylum: Arthropoda
- Class: Insecta
- Order: Coleoptera
- Suborder: Polyphaga
- Infraorder: Cucujiformia
- Family: Cerambycidae
- Subfamily: Lamiinae
- Tribe: Hemilophini
- Genus: Calocosmus; Chevrolat, 1862

Genus of beetles

Calocosmus is a genus of longhorn beetles of the subfamily Lamiinae, containing the following species:

- Calocosmus chevrolati Fisher, 1925
- Calocosmus contortus Lingafelter, 2013
- Calocosmus dimidiatus (Chevrolat in Guérin-Méneville, 1838)
- Calocosmus fulvicollis Fisher, 1925
- Calocosmus hispaniolae Fisher, 1925
- Calocosmus janus Bates, 1881
- Calocosmus magnificus Fisher, 1932
- Calocosmus marginipennis Gahan, 1889
- Calocosmus melanurus Gahan, 1889
- Calocosmus nigripennis Chevrolat, 1862
- Calocosmus nigritarsis Fisher, 1942
- Calocosmus nuptus Chevrolat, 1862
- Calocosmus punctatus Lingafelter, 2013
- Calocosmus rawlinsi Lingafelter, 2013
- Calocosmus robustus Lingafelter, 2013
- Calocosmus semimarginatus Bates, 1881
- Calocosmus speciosus Chevrolat, 1862
- Calocosmus venustus (Chevrolat in Guérin-Méneville, 1838)
