= Hemilophus leucogrammus =

Scientific classification
- Kingdom: Animalia
- Phylum: Arthropoda
- Clade: Pancrustacea
- Class: Insecta
- Order: Coleoptera
- Suborder: Polyphaga
- Infraorder: Cucujiformia
- Family: Cerambycidae
- Genus: Hemilophus
- Species: H. leucogrammus

Binomial name
- Hemilophus leucogrammus Bates, 1881

Synonyms
- Hemilophus leucogramma Bates, 1881

Species of beetle

Hemilophus leucogrammus is a species of beetle in the family Cerambycidae. It was described by Bates in 1881. It is known from Brazil (Rio de Janeiro, Paraná, Rio Grande do Sul) and Paraguay.
