= Canarana affinis =

Scientific classification
- Kingdom: Animalia
- Phylum: Arthropoda
- Class: Insecta
- Order: Coleoptera
- Suborder: Polyphaga
- Infraorder: Cucujiformia
- Family: Cerambycidae
- Genus: Canarana
- Species: C. affinis

Binomial name
- Canarana affinis (Aurivillius, 1908)

Synonyms
- Hilarolea affinis Aurivillius, 1909

Species of beetle

Canarana affinis is a species of beetle in the family Cerambycidae. It was described by Per Olof Christopher Aurivillius in 1908. It is known from Bolivia and Peru.
