= Arixiuna prolixa =

Scientific classification
- Kingdom: Animalia
- Phylum: Arthropoda
- Class: Insecta
- Order: Coleoptera
- Suborder: Polyphaga
- Infraorder: Cucujiformia
- Family: Cerambycidae
- Genus: Arixiuna
- Species: A. prolixa

Binomial name
- Arixiuna prolixa (Bates, 1872)

Synonyms
- Arixiuna prolixus Maes & al., 1994; Hemilophus prolixus Bates, 1872

Species of beetle

Arixiuna prolixa is a species of beetle in the family Cerambycidae. It was described by Bates in 1872. It is known from Costa Rica, Mexico, Nicaragua and Panama.
