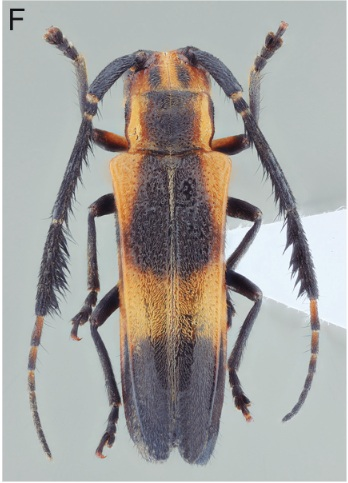

Scientific classification
- Kingdom: Animalia
- Phylum: Arthropoda
- Clade: Pancrustacea
- Class: Insecta
- Order: Coleoptera
- Suborder: Polyphaga
- Infraorder: Cucujiformia
- Family: Cerambycidae
- Genus: Cuicirama
- Species: C. fasciata

Binomial name
- Cuicirama fasciata (Bates, 1866)

Synonyms
- Hemilophus fasciatus Bates, 1866

= Cuicirama fasciata =

Species of beetle

Cuicirama fasciata is a species of beetle in the family Cerambycidae. It was described by Henry Walter Bates in 1866. It is found in Brazil (Amazonas, Pará, Mato Grosso, Goiás, Ceará, São Paulo).
