= Eulachnesia =

Scientific classification
- Kingdom: Animalia
- Phylum: Arthropoda
- Class: Insecta
- Order: Coleoptera
- Suborder: Polyphaga
- Infraorder: Cucujiformia
- Family: Cerambycidae
- Subfamily: Lamiinae
- Tribe: Hemilophini
- Genus: Eulachnesia; Bates, 1872

Genus of beetles

Eulachnesia is a genus of longhorn beetles of the subfamily Lamiinae, containing the following species:

- Eulachnesia amoena Galileo & Martins, 2005
- Eulachnesia cobaltina Bates, 1881
- Eulachnesia humeralis (Fabricius, 1801)
- Eulachnesia monnei Martins & Galileo, 1996
- Eulachnesia smaragdina Bates, 1872
