= Kuatinga =

Scientific classification
- Kingdom: Animalia
- Phylum: Arthropoda
- Class: Insecta
- Order: Coleoptera
- Suborder: Polyphaga
- Infraorder: Cucujiformia
- Family: Cerambycidae
- Subfamily: Lamiinae
- Tribe: Hemilophini
- Genus: Kuatinga; Martins & Galileo, 2004
- Species: K. bicolor

Binomial name
- Kuatinga bicolor Martins & Galileo, 2004

Genus of beetles

Kuatinga bicolor is a species of beetle in the family Cerambycidae, and the only species in the genus Kuatinga. It was described by Martins and Galileo in 2004.
