= Gagarinia mniszechii =

Scientific classification
- Kingdom: Animalia
- Phylum: Arthropoda
- Class: Insecta
- Order: Coleoptera
- Suborder: Polyphaga
- Infraorder: Cucujiformia
- Family: Cerambycidae
- Genus: Gagarinia
- Species: G. mniszechii

Binomial name
- Gagarinia mniszechii (Chabrillac, 1857)

Species of beetle

Gagarinia mniszechii is a species of beetle in the family Cerambycidae. It was described by Chabrillac in 1857. It is known from Brazil.
