= Cuicirama spectabilis =

Scientific classification
- Kingdom: Animalia
- Phylum: Arthropoda
- Class: Insecta
- Order: Coleoptera
- Suborder: Polyphaga
- Infraorder: Cucujiformia
- Family: Cerambycidae
- Genus: Cuicirama
- Species: C. spectabilis

Binomial name
- Cuicirama spectabilis (Blanchard, 1843)

Synonyms
- Hemilophus spectabilis Blanchard, 1843

Species of beetle

Cuicirama spectabilis is a species of beetle in the family Cerambycidae. It was described by Blanchard in 1843. It is known from Bolivia and Ecuador.
