= Calocosmus nuptus =

Scientific classification
- Kingdom: Animalia
- Phylum: Arthropoda
- Clade: Pancrustacea
- Class: Insecta
- Order: Coleoptera
- Suborder: Polyphaga
- Infraorder: Cucujiformia
- Family: Cerambycidae
- Genus: Calocosmus
- Species: C. nuptus

Binomial name
- Calocosmus nuptus Chevrolat, 1862

Synonyms
- Hemilophus nuptus Gemminger & Harold, 1873

Species of beetle

Calocosmus nuptus is a species of beetle in the family Cerambycidae. It was described by Chevrolat in 1862. It is known from Cuba.
