= Eulachnesia humeralis =

Scientific classification
- Kingdom: Animalia
- Phylum: Arthropoda
- Class: Insecta
- Order: Coleoptera
- Suborder: Polyphaga
- Infraorder: Cucujiformia
- Family: Cerambycidae
- Genus: Eulachnesia
- Species: E. humeralis

Binomial name
- Eulachnesia humeralis (Fabricius, 1801)

Species of beetle

Eulachnesia humeralis is a species of beetle in the family Cerambycidae. It was described by Johan Christian Fabricius in 1801. It is known from Brazil.
