= Arixiuna varians =

Scientific classification
- Kingdom: Animalia
- Phylum: Arthropoda
- Class: Insecta
- Order: Coleoptera
- Suborder: Polyphaga
- Infraorder: Cucujiformia
- Family: Cerambycidae
- Genus: Arixiuna
- Species: A. varians

Binomial name
- Arixiuna varians (Bates, 1881)

Synonyms
- Hemilophus varians Bates, 1881

Species of beetle

Arixiuna varians is a species of beetle in the family Cerambycidae. It was described by Henry Walter Bates in 1881. It is known from Costa Rica, Mexico and Guatemala.
