= Cacupira =

Scientific classification
- Kingdom: Animalia
- Phylum: Arthropoda
- Class: Insecta
- Order: Coleoptera
- Suborder: Polyphaga
- Infraorder: Cucujiformia
- Family: Cerambycidae
- Subfamily: Lamiinae
- Tribe: Hemilophini
- Genus: Cacupira; Martins & Galileo, 1991

Genus of beetles

Cacupira is a genus of longhorn beetles of the subfamily Lamiinae, containing the following species:

- Cacupira iodina (Bates, 1881)
- Cacupira tucurui Martins & Galileo, 1991
