= Canarana nigripennis =

Scientific classification
- Kingdom: Animalia
- Phylum: Arthropoda
- Class: Insecta
- Order: Coleoptera
- Suborder: Polyphaga
- Infraorder: Cucujiformia
- Family: Cerambycidae
- Genus: Canarana
- Species: C. nigripennis

Binomial name
- Canarana nigripennis (Bates, 1866)

Synonyms
- Amphionycha nigripennis Bates, 1866; Hemilophus nigripennis Gemminger & Harold, 1873; Hilarolea nigripennis Bates, 1881

Species of beetle

Canarana nigripennis is a species of beetle belonging to the family Cerambycidae. It was described by Henry Walter Bates in 1866. It is known from Brazil.
