= Esamirim carinatus =

Scientific classification
- Kingdom: Animalia
- Phylum: Arthropoda
- Class: Insecta
- Order: Coleoptera
- Suborder: Polyphaga
- Infraorder: Cucujiformia
- Family: Cerambycidae
- Genus: Esamirim
- Species: E. carinatus

Binomial name
- Esamirim carinatus Martins & Galileo, 2004

Species of beetle

Esamirim carinatus is a species of beetle in the family Cerambycidae. It was described by Martins and Galileo in 2004. It is known from Costa Rica.
