= Cabreuva lucianoi =

Scientific classification
- Kingdom: Animalia
- Phylum: Arthropoda
- Clade: Pancrustacea
- Class: Insecta
- Order: Coleoptera
- Suborder: Polyphaga
- Infraorder: Cucujiformia
- Family: Cerambycidae
- Subfamily: Lamiinae
- Tribe: Hemilophini
- Genus: Cabreuva; Martins & Galileo, 1992
- Species: C. lucianoi

Binomial name
- Cabreuva lucianoi Martins & Galileo, 1992

Genus of beetles

Cabreuva lucianoi is a species of beetle in the family Cerambycidae, and the only species in the genus Cabreuva. It was described by Martins and Galileo in 1992. It is found in Colombia.
