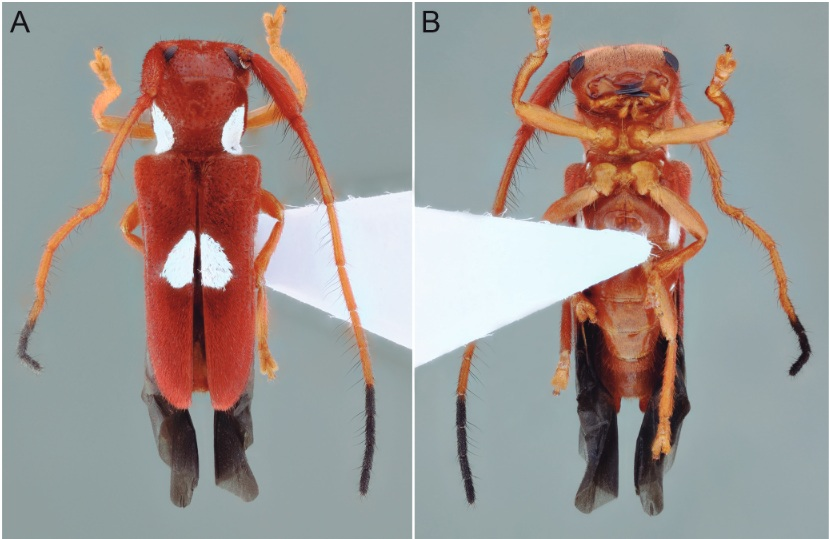

Scientific classification
- Kingdom: Animalia
- Phylum: Arthropoda
- Clade: Pancrustacea
- Class: Insecta
- Order: Coleoptera
- Suborder: Polyphaga
- Infraorder: Cucujiformia
- Family: Cerambycidae
- Genus: Adesmiella; Lane, 1959
- Species: A. cordipicta

Binomial name
- Adesmiella cordipicta Lane, 1959

= Adesmiella =

Genus of beetles

Adesmiella cordipicta is a species of beetle in the family Cerambycidae, and the only species in the genus Adesmiella. It was described by Lane in 1959. It is found in Brazil (Santa Catarina, São Paulo).

== Description ==
Adults reach a length of about 6.55 mm (0.258 in). The head capsule is dark reddish brown dorsally and laterally, and light reddish brown ventrally, on the frons, and genae, except for the dark anterior margin of the genae and postclypeus. The anteclypeus is light reddish and the labrum is light reddish brown on the posterior two-thirds, and dark brown on the anterior third. The ventral mouthparts are light reddish brown, except for the yellowish-brown palpomeres. The mandibles are light reddish brown on the basal two-thirds, and black on the apical third. The scape and pedicel are reddish brown and antennomere III is light reddish brown basally, gradually becoming orangish brown toward the apex. Antennomeres IV-VII are orangish brown and antennomeres VIII-XI are black. The prothorax is dark reddish brown dorsally and laterally and the prosternum is light reddish brown. The prosternal process is yellowish brown with irregular light reddish-brown areas interspersed. The ventral surface of the meso- and metathorax is reddish brown, except for the yellowish-brown apical half of the mesoventral process, and the dark orangish-brown central area of the metaventrite. The scutellum and elytra are dark reddish brown. The legs are orangish brown, but more yellowish brown on some irregular areas.
