= Eraninella =

Scientific classification
- Kingdom: Animalia
- Phylum: Arthropoda
- Class: Insecta
- Order: Coleoptera
- Suborder: Polyphaga
- Infraorder: Cucujiformia
- Family: Cerambycidae
- Genus: Eraninella
- Species: E. longiscapus

Binomial name
- Eraninella longiscapus (Bates, 1881)

Genus of beetles

Eraninella longiscapus is a species of beetle in the family Cerambycidae, and the only species in the genus Eraninella. It was described by Henry Walter Bates in 1881.
