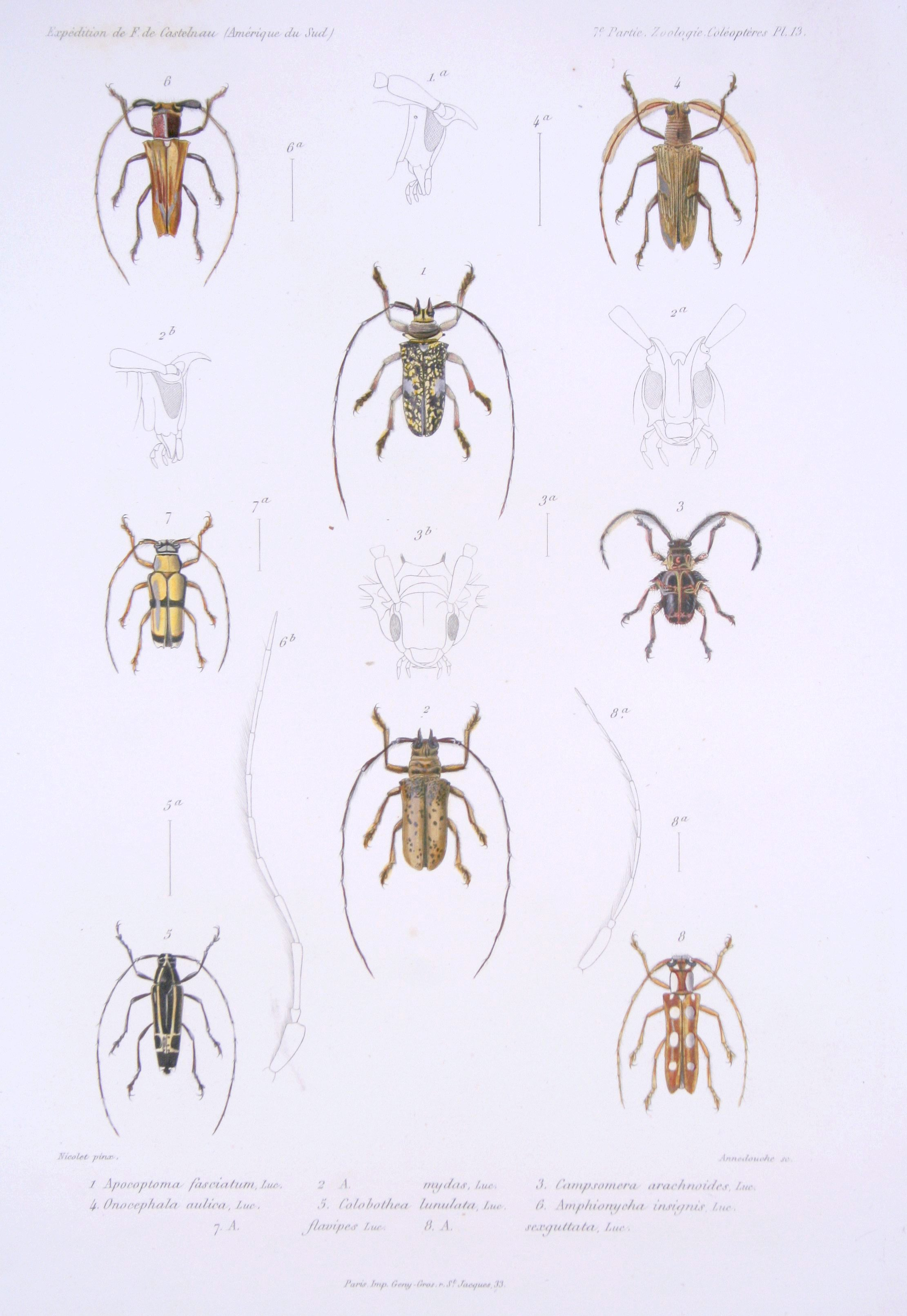

Scientific classification
- Domain: Eukaryota
- Kingdom: Animalia
- Phylum: Arthropoda
- Class: Insecta
- Order: Coleoptera
- Suborder: Polyphaga
- Infraorder: Cucujiformia
- Family: Cerambycidae
- Genus: Butocrysa; Thomson, 1868
- Species: B. insignis

Binomial name
- Butocrysa insignis (H. Lucas, 1857)

= Butocrysa =

Genus of beetles

Butocrysa is a monotypic beetle genus in the family Cerambycidae described by Thomson in 1868. Its only species, Butocrysa insignis, was described by Hippolyte Lucas in 1857.
