= Apypema =

Scientific classification
- Kingdom: Animalia
- Phylum: Arthropoda
- Class: Insecta
- Order: Coleoptera
- Suborder: Polyphaga
- Infraorder: Cucujiformia
- Family: Cerambycidae
- Genus: Apypema
- Species: A. yara

Binomial name
- Apypema yara Galileo & Martins, 1992

Genus of beetles

Apypema yara is a species of beetle in the family Cerambycidae, and the only species in the genus Apypema. It was described by Galileo and Martins in 1992.
