= Columbicella =

Scientific classification
- Kingdom: Animalia
- Phylum: Arthropoda
- Class: Insecta
- Order: Coleoptera
- Suborder: Polyphaga
- Infraorder: Cucujiformia
- Family: Cerambycidae
- Genus: Columbicella
- Species: C. explanata

Binomial name
- Columbicella explanata Galileo & Martins, 1990

Genus of beetles

Columbicella explanata is a species of beetle in the family Cerambycidae, and the only species in the genus Columbicella. It was described by Galileo and Martins in 1990.
