= Ocoa ochromimoides =

Scientific classification
- Kingdom: Animalia
- Phylum: Arthropoda
- Class: Insecta
- Order: Coleoptera
- Suborder: Polyphaga
- Infraorder: Cucujiformia
- Family: Cerambycidae
- Genus: Ocoa
- Species: O. ochromimoides

Binomial name
- Ocoa ochromimoides Lane, 1970

Species of beetle

For the fly genus of the same name, see Evocoa.

Ocoa ochromimoides is a species of beetle in the family Cerambycidae, and the only species in the genus Ocoa. It was described by Lane in 1970.
