= Amapanesia =

Scientific classification
- Kingdom: Animalia
- Phylum: Arthropoda
- Class: Insecta
- Order: Coleoptera
- Suborder: Polyphaga
- Infraorder: Cucujiformia
- Family: Cerambycidae
- Genus: Amapanesia
- Species: A. exotica

Binomial name
- Amapanesia exotica (Martins & Galileo, 1991)

Genus of beetles

Amapanesia exotica is a species of beetle in the family Cerambycidae, and the only species in the genus Amapanesia. It was described by Martins and Galileo in 1991.
