= Melzerina =

Scientific classification
- Kingdom: Animalia
- Phylum: Arthropoda
- Class: Insecta
- Order: Coleoptera
- Suborder: Polyphaga
- Infraorder: Cucujiformia
- Family: Cerambycidae
- Genus: Melzerina
- Species: M. lacordairei

Binomial name
- Melzerina lacordairei (Gahan, 1889)

Genus of beetles

Melzerina lacordairei is a species of beetle in the family Cerambycidae, and the only species in the genus Melzerina. It was described by Gahan in 1889.
