= Cariua =

Scientific classification
- Kingdom: Animalia
- Phylum: Arthropoda
- Class: Insecta
- Order: Coleoptera
- Suborder: Polyphaga
- Infraorder: Cucujiformia
- Family: Cerambycidae
- Genus: Cariua
- Species: C. sulphurea

Binomial name
- Cariua sulphurea Martins & Galileo, 2008

Genus of beetles

Cariua sulphurea is a species of beetle in the family Cerambycidae, and the only species in the genus Cariua. It was described by Martins and Galileo in 2008.
