= Okamira =

Scientific classification
- Kingdom: Animalia
- Phylum: Arthropoda
- Class: Insecta
- Order: Coleoptera
- Suborder: Polyphaga
- Infraorder: Cucujiformia
- Family: Cerambycidae
- Genus: Okamira
- Species: O. pulchra

Binomial name
- Okamira pulchra Galileo & Martins, 2005

Genus of beetles

Okamira pulchra is a species of beetle in the family Cerambycidae, and the only species in the genus Okamira. It was described by Galileo and Martins in 2005.
