= Cathetopteron =

Scientific classification
- Kingdom: Animalia
- Phylum: Arthropoda
- Class: Insecta
- Order: Coleoptera
- Suborder: Polyphaga
- Infraorder: Cucujiformia
- Family: Cerambycidae
- Genus: Cathetopteron
- Species: C. amoena

Binomial name
- Cathetopteron amoena Hamilton in Leng & Hamilton, 1896

Genus of beetles

Cathetopteron amoena is a species of beetle in the family Cerambycidae, and the only species in the genus Cathetopteron. It was described by Hamilton in 1896.
