= Camposiellina =

Scientific classification
- Kingdom: Animalia
- Phylum: Arthropoda
- Class: Insecta
- Order: Coleoptera
- Suborder: Polyphaga
- Infraorder: Cucujiformia
- Family: Cerambycidae
- Genus: Camposiellina
- Species: C. sulfureopicta

Binomial name
- Camposiellina sulfureopicta (Lane, 1972)

Genus of beetles

Camposiellina sulfureopicta is a species of beetle in the family Cerambycidae, and the only species in the genus Camposiellina. It was described by Lane in 1972.
