= Quatiara =

Scientific classification
- Kingdom: Animalia
- Phylum: Arthropoda
- Class: Insecta
- Order: Coleoptera
- Suborder: Polyphaga
- Infraorder: Cucujiformia
- Family: Cerambycidae
- Tribe: Hemilophini
- Genus: Quatiara; Lane, 1972
- Species: Q. luctuosa

Binomial name
- Quatiara luctuosa (Leséleuc, 1844)

Synonyms
- Amphionycha Leséleuc, 1844 (Preocc.)

Genus of beetles

Quatiara luctuosa is a species of beetle in the family Cerambycidae, and the only species in the genus Quatiara. It was described by Leséleuc in 1844.
