= Frankluquetia =

Scientific classification
- Kingdom: Animalia
- Phylum: Arthropoda
- Class: Insecta
- Order: Coleoptera
- Suborder: Polyphaga
- Infraorder: Cucujiformia
- Family: Cerambycidae
- Genus: Frankluquetia
- Species: F. inexpectata

Binomial name
- Frankluquetia inexpectata Tavakilian, 2003

Genus of beetles

Frankluquetia inexpectata is a species of beetle in the family Cerambycidae, and the only species in the genus Frankluquetia. It was described by Tavakilian in 2003.
