= Parapeba =

Scientific classification
- Kingdom: Animalia
- Phylum: Arthropoda
- Class: Insecta
- Order: Coleoptera
- Suborder: Polyphaga
- Infraorder: Cucujiformia
- Family: Cerambycidae
- Genus: Parapeba
- Species: P. lyciformis

Binomial name
- Parapeba lyciformis Galileo & Martins, 2001

Genus of beetles

Parapeba lyciformis is a species of beetle in the family Cerambycidae, and the only species in the genus Parapeba. It was described by Galileo and Martins in 2001.
