= Kyranycha =

Scientific classification
- Kingdom: Animalia
- Phylum: Arthropoda
- Class: Insecta
- Order: Coleoptera
- Suborder: Polyphaga
- Infraorder: Cucujiformia
- Family: Cerambycidae
- Genus: Kyranycha
- Species: K. fraudatrix

Binomial name
- Kyranycha fraudatrix (Bates, 1881)

Genus of beetles

Kyranycha fraudatrix is a species of beetle in the family Cerambycidae, and the only species in the genus Kyranycha. It was described by Henry Walter Bates in 1881.
