= Neomoema =

Scientific classification
- Kingdom: Animalia
- Phylum: Arthropoda
- Class: Insecta
- Order: Coleoptera
- Suborder: Polyphaga
- Infraorder: Cucujiformia
- Family: Cerambycidae
- Genus: Neomoema
- Species: N. cendi

Binomial name
- Neomoema cendi (Martins & Galileo, 1992)

Genus of beetles

Neomoema cendi is a species of beetle in the family Cerambycidae, and the only species in the genus Neomoema. It was described by Martins and Galileo in 1992.
