= Cotysomerida =

Scientific classification
- Kingdom: Animalia
- Phylum: Arthropoda
- Class: Insecta
- Order: Coleoptera
- Suborder: Polyphaga
- Infraorder: Cucujiformia
- Family: Cerambycidae
- Genus: Cotysomerida
- Species: C. lampyroides

Binomial name
- Cotysomerida lampyroides Martins & Galileo, 2009

Genus of beetles

Cotysomerida lampyroides is a species of beetle in the family Cerambycidae, and the only species in the genus Cotysomerida. It was described by Martins and Galileo in 2009.
