= Spathoptera =

Scientific classification
- Kingdom: Animalia
- Phylum: Arthropoda
- Class: Insecta
- Order: Coleoptera
- Suborder: Polyphaga
- Infraorder: Cucujiformia
- Family: Cerambycidae
- Genus: Spathoptera
- Species: S. albilatera

Binomial name
- Spathoptera albilatera Audinet-Serville, 1868

Genus of beetles

Spathoptera albilatera is a species of beetle in the family Cerambycidae, and the only species in the genus Spathoptera. It was described by Audinet-Serville in 1868.
