= Susuanycha =

Scientific classification
- Kingdom: Animalia
- Phylum: Arthropoda
- Class: Insecta
- Order: Coleoptera
- Suborder: Polyphaga
- Infraorder: Cucujiformia
- Family: Cerambycidae
- Genus: Susuanycha
- Species: S. susua

Binomial name
- Susuanycha susua Galileo & Martins, 2005

Genus of beetles

Susuanycha susua is a species of beetle in the family Cerambycidae, and the only species in the genus Susuanycha. It was described by Galileo and Martins in 2005.
