= Dylobolus =

Scientific classification
- Kingdom: Animalia
- Phylum: Arthropoda
- Class: Insecta
- Order: Coleoptera
- Suborder: Polyphaga
- Infraorder: Cucujiformia
- Family: Cerambycidae
- Genus: Dylobolus; Thomson, 1868
- Species: D. rotundicollis

Binomial name
- Dylobolus rotundicollis Thomson, 1868

Synonyms
- List (Genus): Pannychina Gilmour, 1962; (Species): Dylobolus rotundicollis Lacordaire, 1872; Hemilophus rotundicollis Gemminger & Harold, 1873; Mecas bivitticollis Breuning, 1955; Mecas laticeps Aurivillius, 1923; Mecas laticeps Bates, 1881; Mecas laticeps Blackwelder, 1946; Mecas laticeps Breuning, 1967; Mecas mexicana Aurivillius, 1923; Mecas mexicana Bates, 1881; Mecas mexicana Blackwelder, 1946; Mecas rotundicollis Aurivillius, 1923; Mecas rotundicollis Bates, 1881; Mecas rotundicollis Blackwelder, 1946; Mecas rotundicollis Breuning, 1967; Mecas rotundicollis Chemsak & Noguera, 1993; Mecas rotundicollis (Thomson, 1868); Mecas ruficollis Aurivillius, 1923; Mecas ruficollis Bates, 1881; Mecas ruficollis Blackwelder, 1946; Mecas ruficollis Casey, 1913; Mecas ruficollis Horn, 1878; Mecas ruficollis Leng & Hamilton, 1896; Mecas ruficollis Linsley, Knull & Statham, 1961; Mecas vitticollis Aurivillius, 1923; Mecas vitticollis Blackwelder, 1946; Mecas vitticollis Casey, 1913; Mecas vitticollis Knull, 1934; Mecas vitticollis Lingafelter et al., 2014; Oberea laticeps Lameere, 1883; Oberea mexicana Lameere, 1883; Pannychina atripennis (Bates, 1885)

Genus of beetles

Dylobolus is a genus of longhorn beetles found in Central America and southern North America. It is monotypic, being represented by the single species Dylobolus rotundicollis. The genus was erected and the species was described by James Thomson in 1868.
