= Hemilocrinitus =

Scientific classification
- Kingdom: Animalia
- Phylum: Arthropoda
- Class: Insecta
- Order: Coleoptera
- Suborder: Polyphaga
- Infraorder: Cucujiformia
- Family: Cerambycidae
- Genus: Hemilocrinitus
- Species: H. barbatus

Binomial name
- Hemilocrinitus barbatus Galileo & Martins, 2005

Genus of beetles

Hemilocrinitus barbatus is a species of beetle in the family Cerambycidae, and the only species in the genus Hemilocrinitus. It was described by Galileo and Martins in 2005.
