= Acapiata =

Scientific classification
- Kingdom: Animalia
- Phylum: Arthropoda
- Clade: Pancrustacea
- Class: Insecta
- Order: Coleoptera
- Suborder: Polyphaga
- Infraorder: Cucujiformia
- Family: Cerambycidae
- Genus: Acapiata
- Species: A. dilatata

Binomial name
- Acapiata dilatata Galileo & Martins, 2005

Genus of beetles

Acapiata dilatata is a species of beetle in the family Cerambycidae, and the only species in the genus Acapiata. It was described by Galileo and Martins in 2005.
