= Tetanola =

Scientific classification
- Kingdom: Animalia
- Phylum: Arthropoda
- Class: Insecta
- Order: Coleoptera
- Suborder: Polyphaga
- Infraorder: Cucujiformia
- Family: Cerambycidae
- Genus: Tetanola
- Species: T. polita

Binomial name
- Tetanola polita Bates, 1881

Genus of beetles

Tetanola polita is a species of beetle in the family Cerambycidae, and the only species in the genus Tetanola. It was described by Henry Walter Bates in 1881.
