= Ipepo =

Scientific classification
- Kingdom: Animalia
- Phylum: Arthropoda
- Class: Insecta
- Order: Coleoptera
- Suborder: Polyphaga
- Infraorder: Cucujiformia
- Family: Cerambycidae
- Genus: Ipepo
- Species: I. dilatatus

Binomial name
- Ipepo dilatatus Martins & Galileo, 2008

Genus of beetles

Ipepo dilatatus is a species of beetle in the family Cerambycidae, and the only species in the genus Ipepo. It was described by Martins and Galileo in 2008.
