= Iatuca =

Scientific classification
- Kingdom: Animalia
- Phylum: Arthropoda
- Class: Insecta
- Order: Coleoptera
- Suborder: Polyphaga
- Infraorder: Cucujiformia
- Family: Cerambycidae
- Genus: Iatuca
- Species: I. brevicornis

Binomial name
- Iatuca brevicornis Galileo & Martins, 2004

Genus of beetles

Iatuca brevicornis is a species of beetle in the family Cerambycidae, and the only species in the genus Iatuca. It was described by Galileo and Martins in 2004.
