= Paleohemilophus =

Scientific classification
- Kingdom: Animalia
- Phylum: Arthropoda
- Class: Insecta
- Order: Coleoptera
- Suborder: Polyphaga
- Infraorder: Cucujiformia
- Family: Cerambycidae
- Genus: Paleohemilophus
- Species: P. dominicanus

Binomial name
- Paleohemilophus dominicanus Martins & Galileo, 1999

Genus of beetles

Paleohemilophus dominicanus is an extinct species of beetle in the family Cerambycidae, and the only species in the genus Paleohemilophus. It was described by Martins and Galileo in 1999.
