= Apebusu =

Scientific classification
- Kingdom: Animalia
- Phylum: Arthropoda
- Class: Insecta
- Order: Coleoptera
- Suborder: Polyphaga
- Infraorder: Cucujiformia
- Family: Cerambycidae
- Genus: Apebusu
- Species: A. rubriventris

Binomial name
- Apebusu rubriventris Martins & Galileo, 2004

Genus of beetles

Apebusu rubriventris is a species of beetle in the family Cerambycidae, and the only species in the genus Apebusu. It was described by Martins and Galileo in 2004.
