= Icaunauna =

Scientific classification
- Kingdom: Animalia
- Phylum: Arthropoda
- Class: Insecta
- Order: Coleoptera
- Suborder: Polyphaga
- Infraorder: Cucujiformia
- Family: Cerambycidae
- Genus: Icaunauna
- Species: I. aurantium

Binomial name
- Icaunauna aurantium Martins & Galileo, 2009

Genus of beetles

Icaunauna aurantium is a species of beetle in the family Cerambycidae, and the only species in the genus Icaunauna. It was described by Martins and Galileo in 2009.
