= Mocoiasura =

Scientific classification
- Kingdom: Animalia
- Phylum: Arthropoda
- Class: Insecta
- Order: Coleoptera
- Suborder: Polyphaga
- Infraorder: Cucujiformia
- Family: Cerambycidae
- Genus: Mocoiasura; Martins & Galileo, 1991
- Species: M. suturalis

Binomial name
- Mocoiasura suturalis (Melzer, 1931)

Species of beetles

Mocoiasura suturalis is a species of beetle in the family Cerambycidae, and the only species in the genus Mocoiasura. It was described by Melzer in 1931.
