= Pseudegalicia =

Scientific classification
- Kingdom: Animalia
- Phylum: Arthropoda
- Class: Insecta
- Order: Coleoptera
- Suborder: Polyphaga
- Infraorder: Cucujiformia
- Family: Cerambycidae
- Genus: Pseudegalicia
- Species: P. tetrops

Binomial name
- Pseudegalicia tetrops Galileo & Martins, 2001

Genus of beetles

Pseudegalicia tetrops is a species of beetle in the family Cerambycidae, and the only species in the genus Pseudegalicia. It was described by Galileo and Martins in 2001.
