= Ischnophygas =

Scientific classification
- Kingdom: Animalia
- Phylum: Arthropoda
- Class: Insecta
- Order: Coleoptera
- Suborder: Polyphaga
- Infraorder: Cucujiformia
- Family: Cerambycidae
- Genus: Ischnophygas
- Species: I. telephoroides

Binomial name
- Ischnophygas telephoroides Thomson, 1868

Genus of beetles

Ischnophygas telephoroides is a species of beetle in the family Cerambycidae, and the only species in the genus Ischnophygas. It was described by Thomson in 1868.
