= Porangonycha =

Scientific classification
- Kingdom: Animalia
- Phylum: Arthropoda
- Class: Insecta
- Order: Coleoptera
- Suborder: Polyphaga
- Infraorder: Cucujiformia
- Family: Cerambycidae
- Genus: Porangonycha
- Species: P. princeps

Binomial name
- Porangonycha princeps (Bates, 1872)

Genus of beetles

Porangonycha princeps is a species of beetle in the family Cerambycidae, and the only species in the genus Porangonycha. It was described by Henry Walter Bates in 1872.
