= Quirimbaua =

Scientific classification
- Kingdom: Animalia
- Phylum: Arthropoda
- Class: Insecta
- Order: Coleoptera
- Suborder: Polyphaga
- Infraorder: Cucujiformia
- Family: Cerambycidae
- Genus: Quirimbaua
- Species: Q. castroi

Binomial name
- Quirimbaua castroi Martins & Galileo, 2004

Genus of beetles

Quirimbaua castroi is a species of beetle in the family Cerambycidae, and the only species in the genus Quirimbaua. It was described by Martins and Galileo in 2004.
