= Cotyabanycha =

Scientific classification
- Domain: Eukaryota
- Kingdom: Animalia
- Phylum: Arthropoda
- Class: Insecta
- Order: Coleoptera
- Suborder: Polyphaga
- Infraorder: Cucujiformia
- Family: Cerambycidae
- Genus: Cotyabanycha; Galileo & Martins, 2013
- Species: C. ocularis

Binomial name
- Cotyabanycha ocularis Galileo & Martins, 2013

Genus of insects

Cotyabanycha is a genus of long-horned beetles in the family Cerambycidae. There is one described species in Cotyabanycha, C. ocularis.
