= Themistonoe =

Scientific classification
- Kingdom: Animalia
- Phylum: Arthropoda
- Class: Insecta
- Order: Coleoptera
- Suborder: Polyphaga
- Infraorder: Cucujiformia
- Family: Cerambycidae
- Genus: Themistonoe
- Species: T. cacica

Binomial name
- Themistonoe cacica Thomson, 1864

Genus of beetles

Themistonoe cacica is a species of beetle in the family Cerambycidae, and the only species in the genus Themistonoe. It was described by Thomson in 1864.
