= Endybauna =

Scientific classification
- Kingdom: Animalia
- Phylum: Arthropoda
- Class: Insecta
- Order: Coleoptera
- Suborder: Polyphaga
- Infraorder: Cucujiformia
- Family: Cerambycidae
- Genus: Endybauna
- Species: E. rapicara

Binomial name
- Endybauna rapicara Martins & Galileo, 1991

Genus of beetles

Endybauna rapicara is a species of beetle in the family Cerambycidae, and the only species in the genus Endybauna. It was described by Martins and Galileo in 1991.
