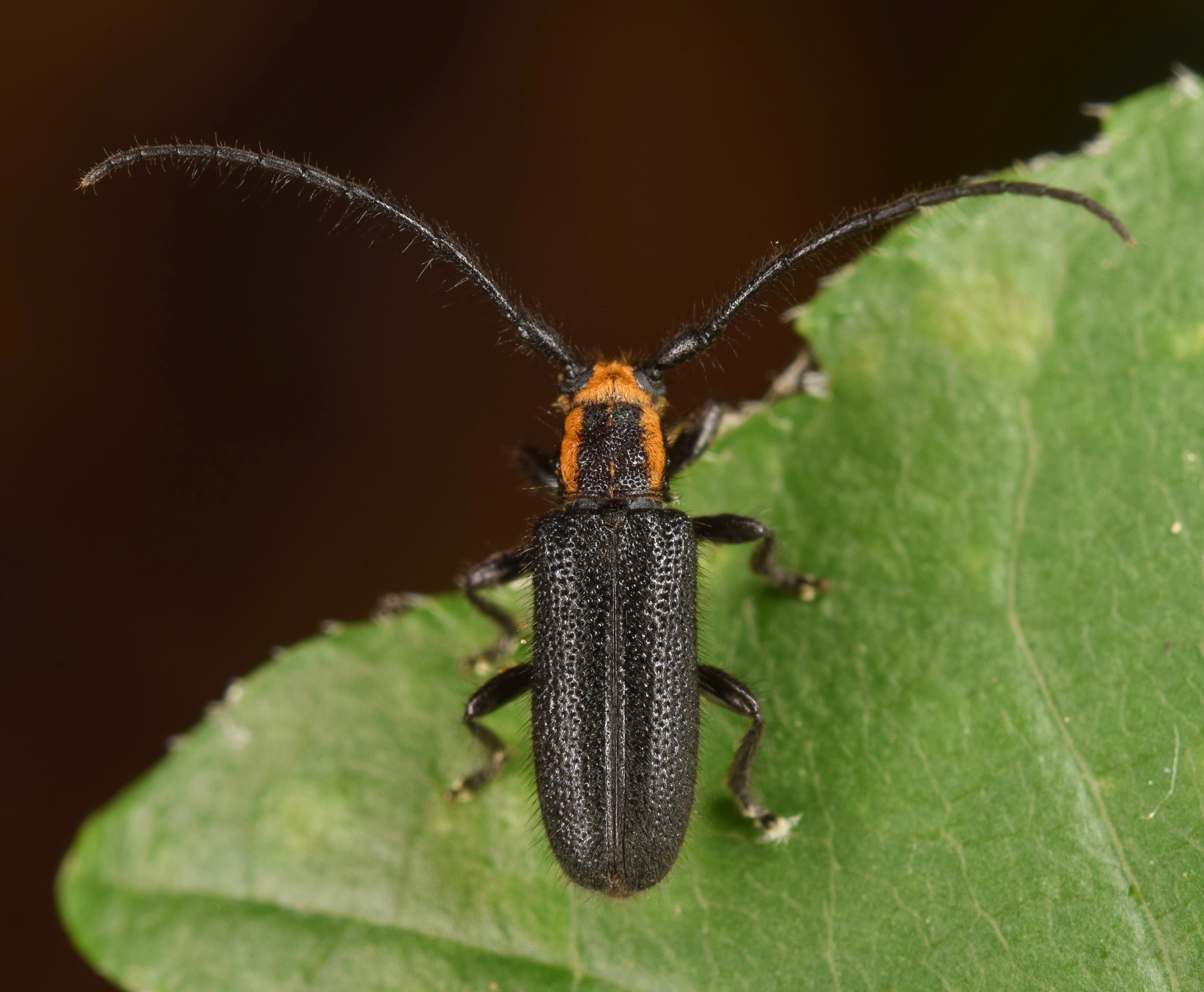

Scientific classification
- Domain: Eukaryota
- Kingdom: Animalia
- Phylum: Arthropoda
- Class: Insecta
- Order: Coleoptera
- Suborder: Polyphaga
- Infraorder: Cucujiformia
- Family: Cerambycidae
- Tribe: Hemilophini
- Genus: Hemierana; Aurivillius, 1923

species
- see text

Synonyms
- Amphionycha Haldeman, 1847 (Preocc.)

= Hemierana =

Genus of beetles

Hemierana is a genus of beetle in the family Cerambycidae, from North America. It contains two described species:

- Hemierana marginata (Fabricius, 1798)
- Hemierana rileyi Heffern et al., 2019
