= Evocoa =

Scientific classification
- Kingdom: Animalia
- Phylum: Arthropoda
- Class: Insecta
- Order: Diptera
- Infraorder: Asilomorpha
- Superfamily: Asiloidea
- Family: Evocoidae; Yeates, Irwin & Wiegmann, 2006
- Genus: Evocoa; Yeates, Irwin & Wiegmann, 2006
- Species: E. chilensis

Binomial name
- Evocoa chilensis (Yeates, Irwin & Wiegmann, 2003)

Synonyms
- Ocoa Yeates, Irwin & Wiegmann, 2003

Genus of insects

Evocoa is a monotypic genus of flies containing the single species Evocoa chilensis. It is the only genus in the family Evocoidae.

This fly was described in 2003 with the name Ocoa chilensis, and it was placed in its own family, but that genus name was preoccupied. A new genus name was coined in 2006.

This species is a small fly native to Chile.
