= A. angustatus =

A. angustatus may refer to:

- Abacetus angustatus, an African ground beetle
- Aspergillus angustatus, a fungus
