= Amorphochelus insulatus =

Scientific classification
- Kingdom: Animalia
- Phylum: Arthropoda
- Class: Insecta
- Order: Coleoptera
- Suborder: Polyphaga
- Infraorder: Scarabaeiformia
- Family: Scarabaeidae
- Genus: Amorphochelus
- Species: A. insulatus

Binomial name
- Amorphochelus insulatus Lacroix, 1997

Species of beetle

Amorphochelus insulatus is a species of beetle of the family Scarabaeidae. It is found in Madagascar.

== Description ==
Adults reach a length of about 7 mm (0.28 in). Their body is more robust than that of similar Amorphochelus limatus. The upper surface is reddish-brown with sparse hairs.
