= Lycidola palliata =

Scientific classification
- Domain: Eukaryota
- Kingdom: Animalia
- Phylum: Arthropoda
- Class: Insecta
- Order: Coleoptera
- Suborder: Polyphaga
- Infraorder: Cucujiformia
- Family: Cerambycidae
- Tribe: Hemilophini
- Genus: Lycidola
- Species: L. palliata

Binomial name
- Lycidola palliata (Klug, 1825)

Synonyms
- Hemilophus palliatus Gemminger & Harold, 1873; Saperda palliata Klug, 1825; Spathoptera palliata Audinet-Serville, 1835

Species of beetle

Lycidola palliata is a species of beetle in the family Cerambycidae. It was described by Johann Christoph Friedrich Klug in 1825. It is known from Brazil.
