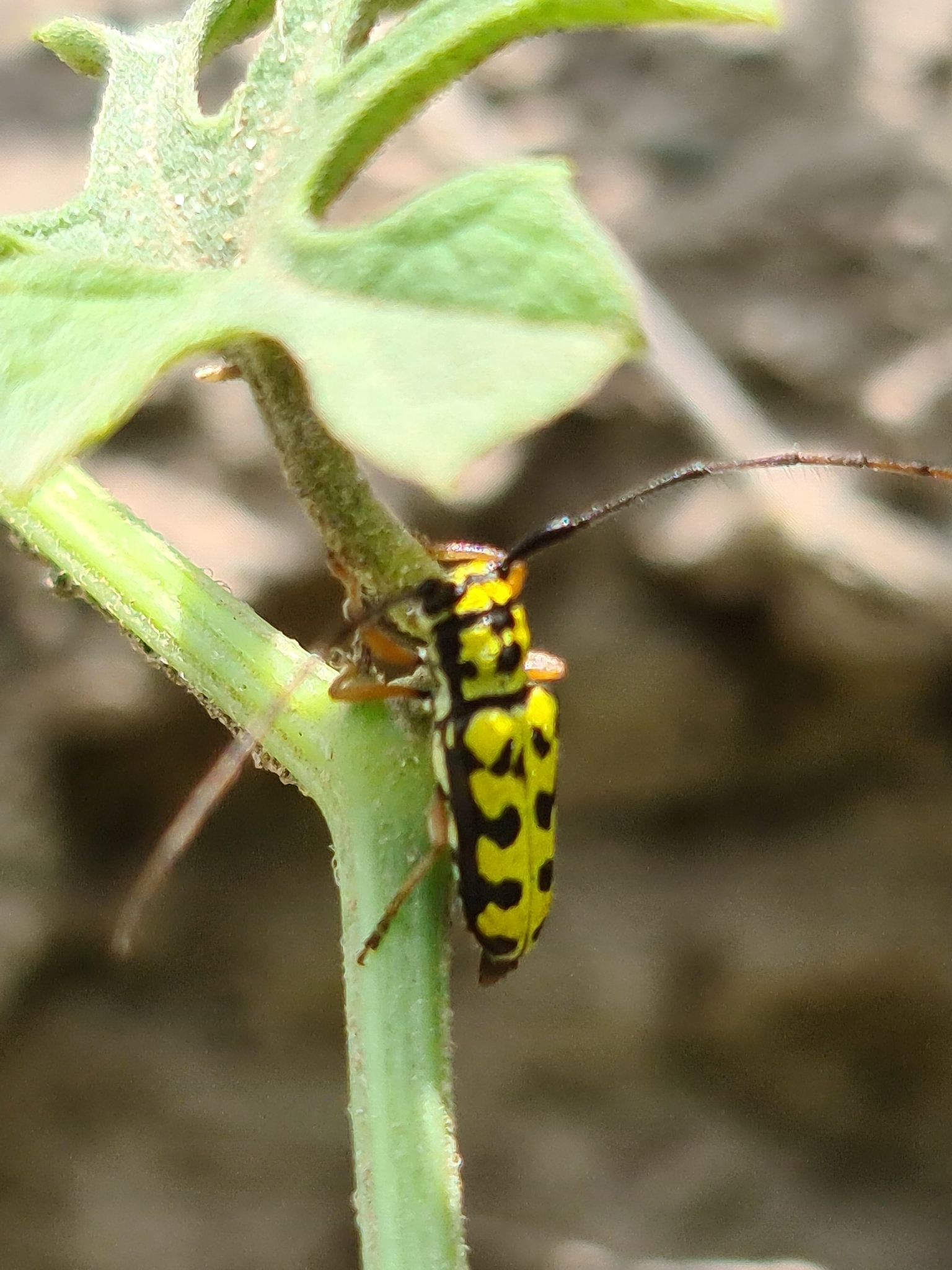
- Zeale nigromaculata, Argentina
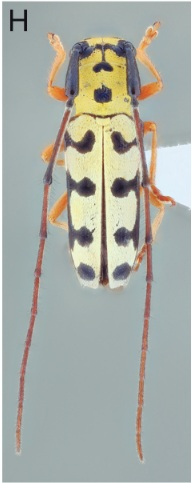

Scientific classification
- Kingdom: Animalia
- Phylum: Arthropoda
- Clade: Pancrustacea
- Class: Insecta
- Order: Coleoptera
- Suborder: Polyphaga
- Infraorder: Cucujiformia
- Family: Cerambycidae
- Subfamily: Lamiinae
- Tribe: Hemilophini
- Genus: Zeale
- Species: Z. nigromaculata

Binomial name
- Zeale nigromaculata (Klug, 1829)

Synonyms
- Adesmus nigromaculatus Zischka, 1948; Amphionycha leucomelaena Gistel, 1857; Amphionycha petronae Bates, 1881; Amphionycha spilota Bates, 1881; Hemilophus petronae Gemminger & Harold, 1873; Hemilophus spilotus Lameere, 1883; Saperda nigromaculata Klug, 1829

= Zeale nigromaculata =

Species of beetle

Zeale nigromaculata is a species of beetle in the family Cerambycidae. It was described by Johann Christoph Friedrich Klug in 1829. It is known from Bolivia, Argentina, Brazil, Paraguay, and Uruguay.
