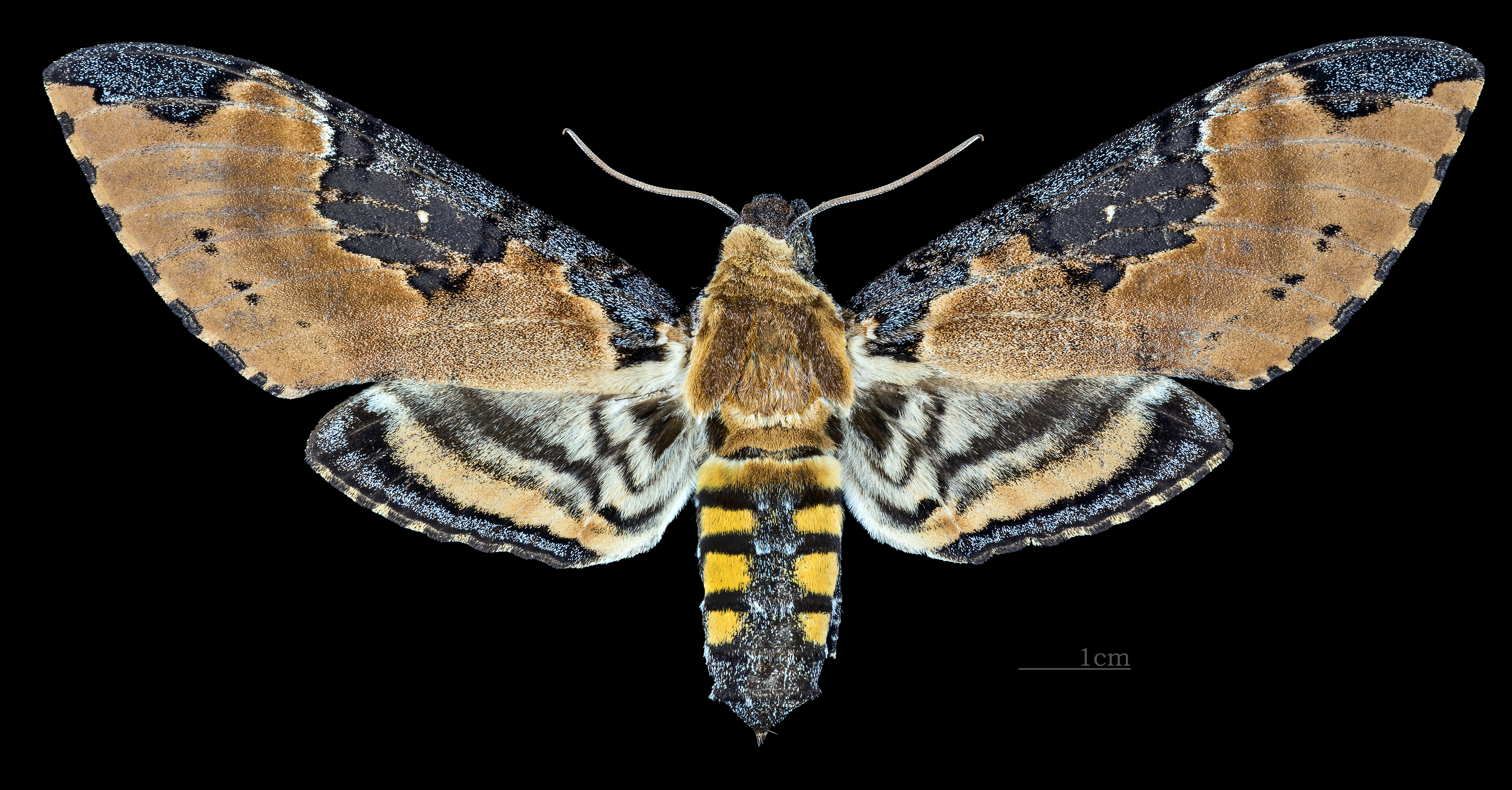
- Female, dorsal view
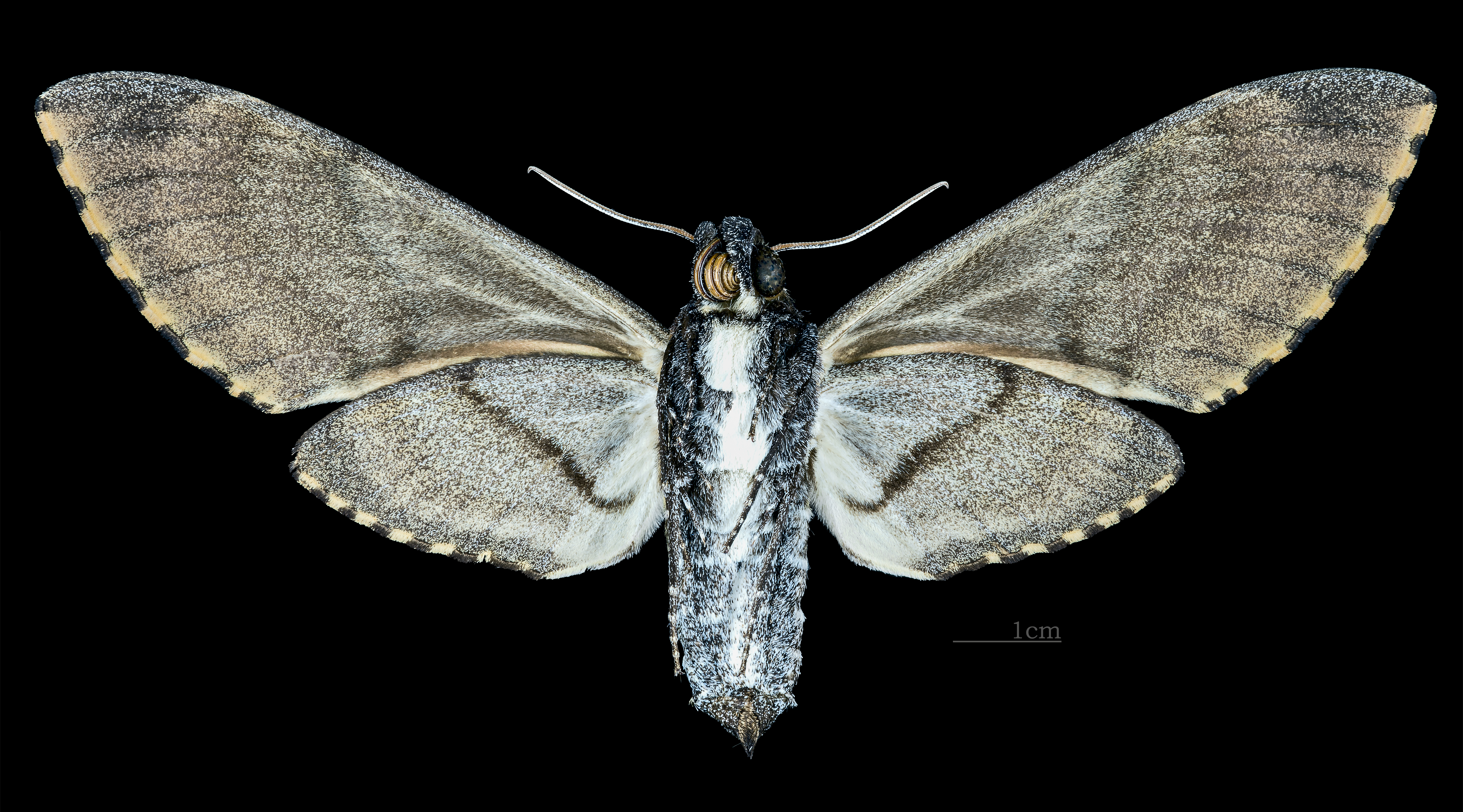
- Female, ventral view

Scientific classification
- Kingdom: Animalia
- Phylum: Arthropoda
- Class: Insecta
- Order: Lepidoptera
- Family: Sphingidae
- Genus: Manduca
- Species: M. ochus

Binomial name
- Manduca ochus (Klug, 1836)

Synonyms
- Sphinx ochus Klug, 1836; Macrosila instita Clemens, 1859; Protoparce ochus

= Manduca ochus =

Species of moth

Manduca ochus is a moth of the family Sphingidae first described by Johann Christoph Friedrich Klug in 1836.

== Distribution ==
It is found in Mexico, Belize, Nicaragua to Venezuela and Ecuador.

== Description ==
The wingspan is about 12 centimetres (4.7 in).

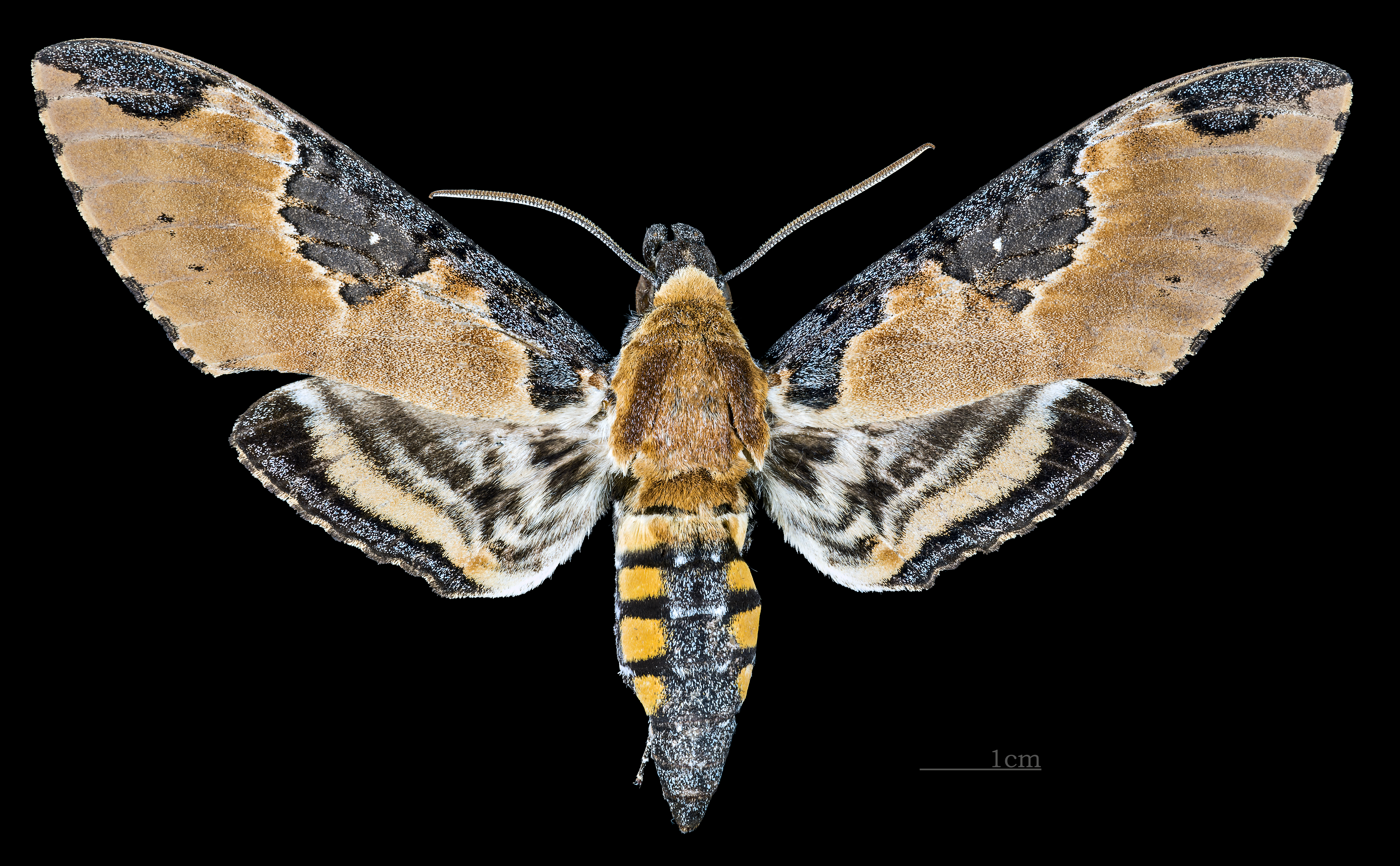
Male, dorsal view

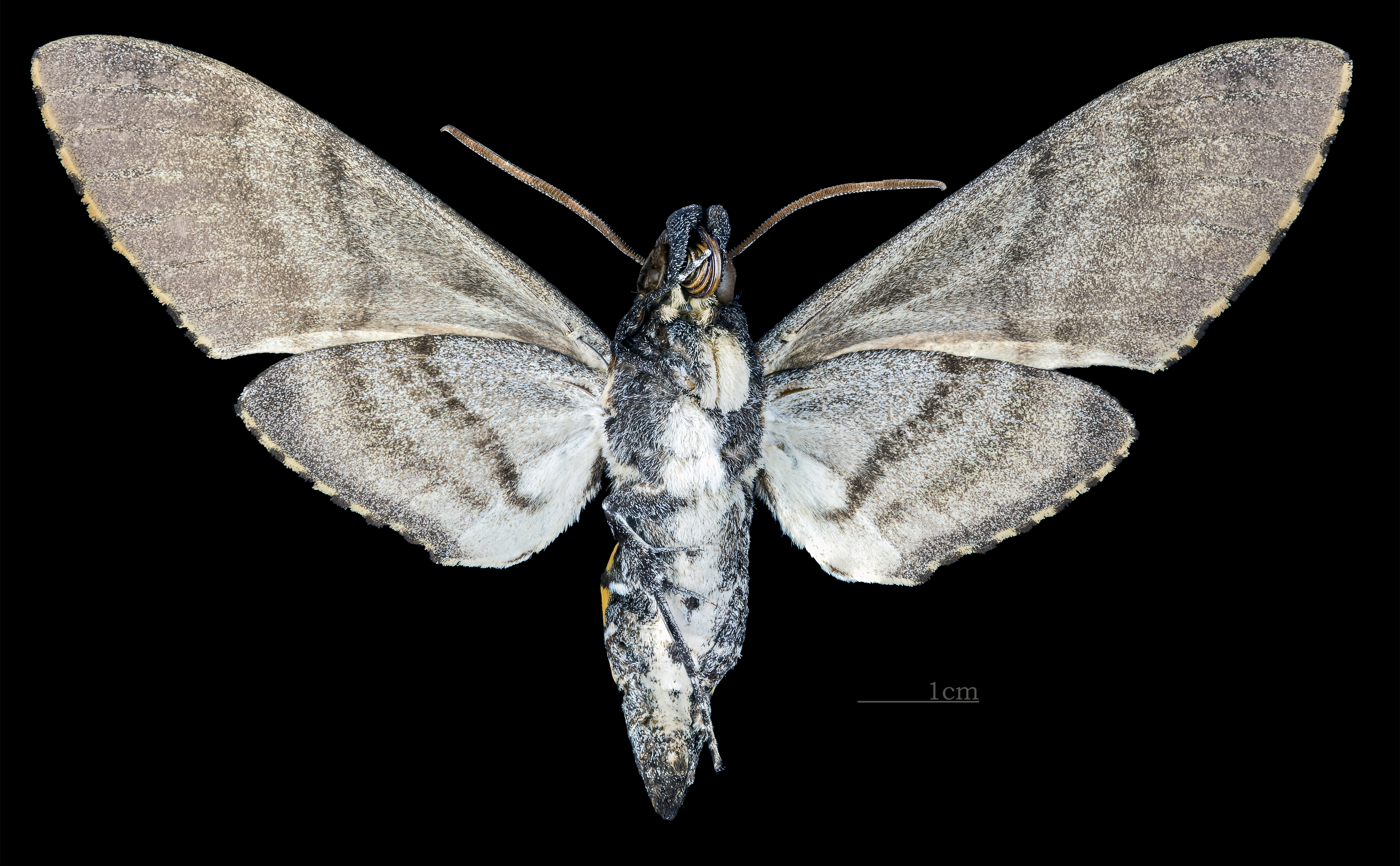
Male, ventral view

== Biology ==
There are probably two or three generations per year, with adults on wing in nearly all months in Costa Rica.

The larvae probably feed on Solanaceae species.
