= Lycomimus ampliatus =

Scientific classification
- Kingdom: Animalia
- Phylum: Arthropoda
- Class: Insecta
- Order: Coleoptera
- Suborder: Polyphaga
- Infraorder: Cucujiformia
- Family: Cerambycidae
- Genus: Lycomimus
- Species: L. ampliatus

Binomial name
- Lycomimus ampliatus (Klug, 1825)

Synonyms
- Hemilophus ampliatus Haase, 1892; Saperda ampliata Klug, 1825; Spathoptera ampliata Audinet-Serville, 1835

Species of beetle

Lycomimus ampliatus is a species of beetle in the family Cerambycidae. It was described by Johann Christoph Friedrich Klug in 1825. It is known from Brazil.
