= Clivina anthracina =

Scientific classification
- Domain: Eukaryota
- Kingdom: Animalia
- Phylum: Arthropoda
- Class: Insecta
- Order: Coleoptera
- Suborder: Adephaga
- Family: Carabidae
- Genus: Clivina
- Species: C. anthracina

Binomial name
- Clivina anthracina Klug, 1862

Species of beetle

Clivina anthracina is a species of ground beetle in the subfamily Scaritinae. It was described by Johann Christoph Friedrich Klug in 1862.
