= Abacetus parvulus =

Scientific classification
- Domain: Eukaryota
- Kingdom: Animalia
- Phylum: Arthropoda
- Class: Insecta
- Order: Coleoptera
- Suborder: Adephaga
- Family: Carabidae
- Genus: Abacetus
- Species: A. parvulus

Binomial name
- Abacetus parvulus (Klug, 1853)

Species of beetle

Abacetus parvulus is a species of ground beetle in the subfamily Pterostichinae. It was described by Johann Christoph Friedrich Klug in 1853.

Abacetus is a single European species belongs to the beetle genus which is found in Africa, Asia, and Australia.

== Taxonomy (GBIF) ==
Kingdom: Animalia

Phylum: Arthropoda

Class: Insecta

Family : Carabidae
