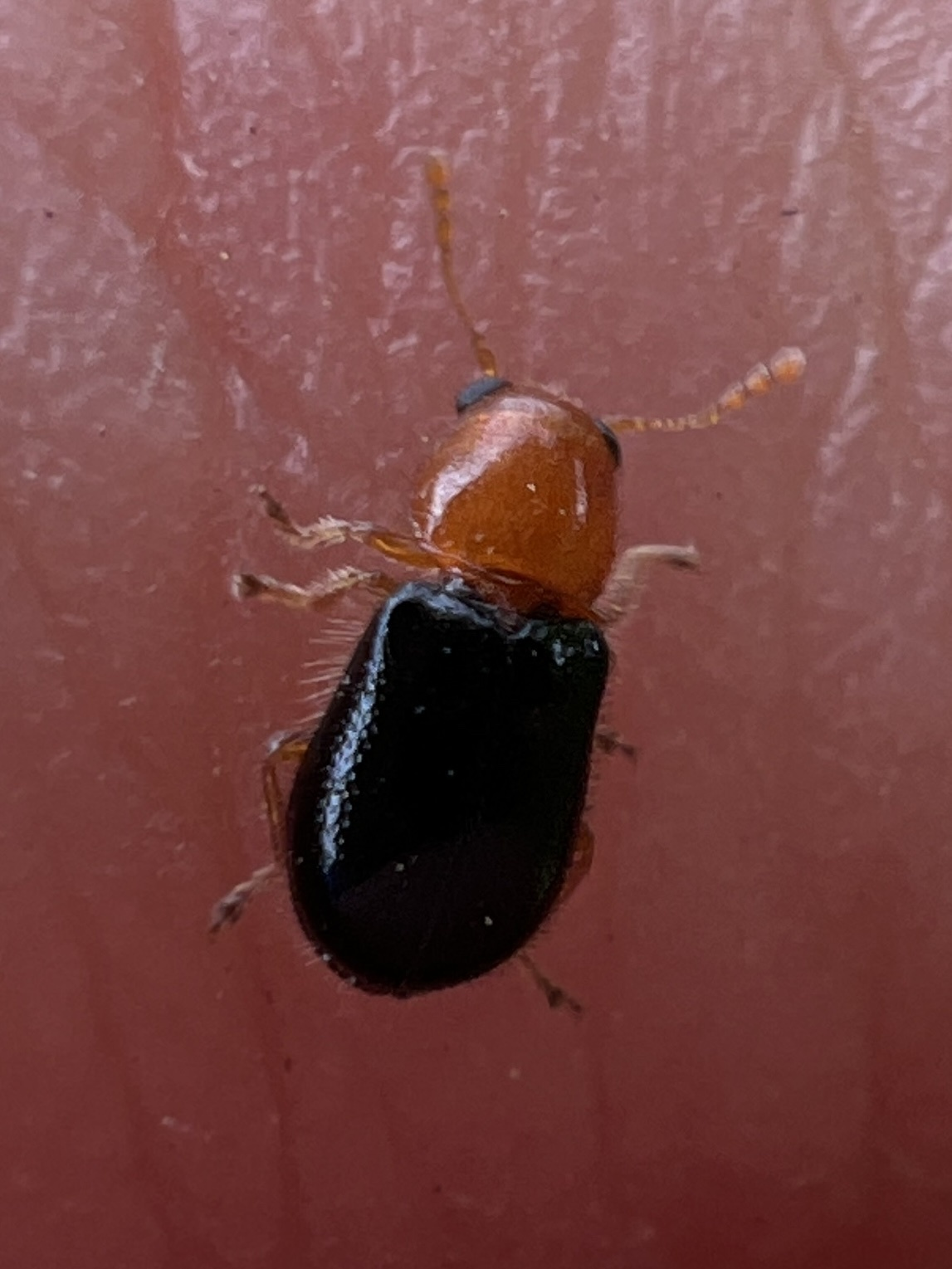

Scientific classification
- Kingdom: Animalia
- Phylum: Arthropoda
- Clade: Pancrustacea
- Class: Insecta
- Order: Coleoptera
- Suborder: Polyphaga
- Infraorder: Cucujiformia
- Family: Cleridae
- Genus: Lebasiella
- Species: L. pallipes

Binomial name
- Lebasiella pallipes (Klug, 1842)

= Lebasiella pallipes =

Species of beetle

Lebasiella pallipes is a species of checkered beetle in the family Cleridae. It is found in Central America and North America.
