= Apeba togata =

Scientific classification
- Domain: Eukaryota
- Kingdom: Animalia
- Phylum: Arthropoda
- Class: Insecta
- Order: Coleoptera
- Suborder: Polyphaga
- Infraorder: Cucujiformia
- Family: Cerambycidae
- Subfamily: Lamiinae
- Tribe: Hemilophini
- Genus: Apeba
- Species: A. togata

Binomial name
- Apeba togata (Klug, 1825)

Synonyms
- Hemilophus togatus Haase, 1892; Apeba antiqua (Waterhouse, 1880); Lycidola togata Bates, 1881; Saperda tagita Chenu, 1851; Saperda togata Klug, 1825; Hemilophus antiquus (Waterhouse, 1880); Hemilophus togatus (Klug, 1825)

Species of beetle

Apeba togata is a species of longhorned beetle in the family Cerambycidae. It was described by Johann Christoph Friedrich Klug in 1825. It is known from Brazil.
