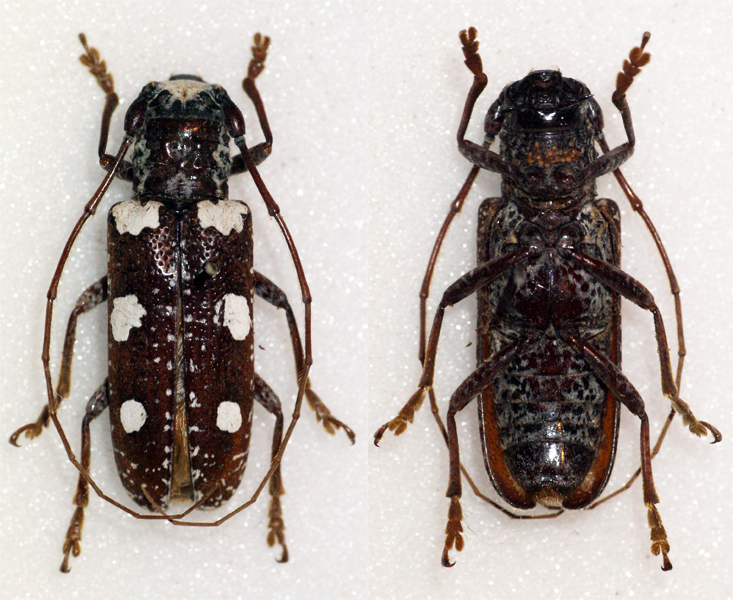

Scientific classification
- Kingdom: Animalia
- Phylum: Arthropoda
- Class: Insecta
- Order: Coleoptera
- Suborder: Polyphaga
- Infraorder: Cucujiformia
- Family: Cerambycidae
- Genus: Protorhopala
- Species: P. sexnotata

Binomial name
- Protorhopala sexnotata (Klug, 1833)

= Protorhopala sexnotata =

Species of beetle

Protorhopala sexnotata is a species of beetle in the family Cerambycidae. It was described by Johann Christoph Friedrich Klug in 1833. It is known from Madagascar.
