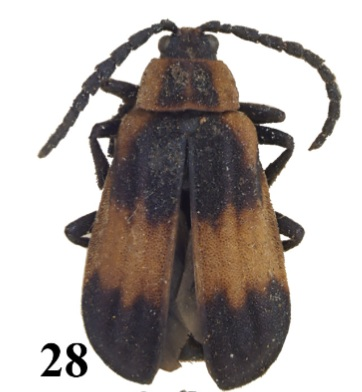

Scientific classification
- Kingdom: Animalia
- Phylum: Arthropoda
- Clade: Pancrustacea
- Class: Insecta
- Order: Coleoptera
- Suborder: Polyphaga
- Infraorder: Cucujiformia
- Family: Chrysomelidae
- Genus: Schematiza
- Species: S. flavofasciata

Binomial name
- Schematiza flavofasciata (Klug, 1829)

Synonyms
- Galleruca flavofasciata Klug, 1829

= Schematiza flavofasciata =

Species of beetle

Schematiza flavofasciata is a species of beetle of the family Chrysomelidae. It is found in Brazil, Paraguay and Argentina.
