= Glenea balteata =

Scientific classification
- Domain: Eukaryota
- Kingdom: Animalia
- Phylum: Arthropoda
- Class: Insecta
- Order: Coleoptera
- Suborder: Polyphaga
- Infraorder: Cucujiformia
- Family: Cerambycidae
- Genus: Glenea
- Species: G. balteata

Binomial name
- Glenea balteata (Klug, 1835)

Synonyms
- Sphenura balteata Klug, 1835

Species of beetle

Glenea balteata is a species of beetle in the family Cerambycidae. It was described by Johann Christoph Friedrich Klug in 1835. It is known from the Democratic Republic of the Congo, São Tomé and Príncipe, and Cameroon.
