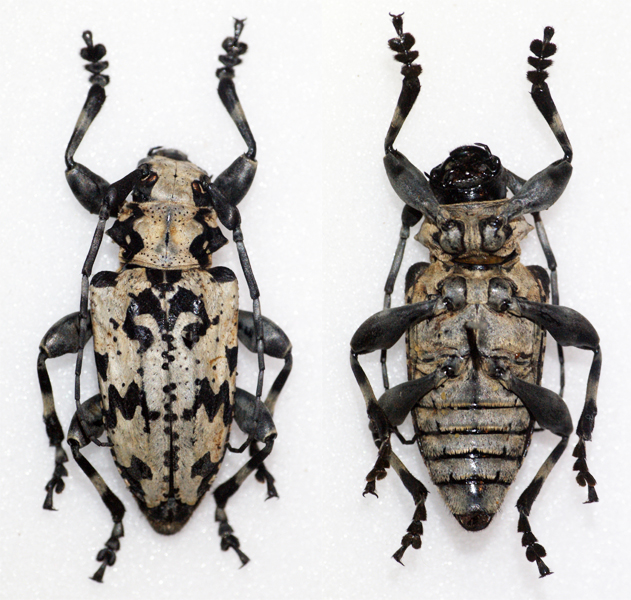

Scientific classification
- Kingdom: Animalia
- Phylum: Arthropoda
- Class: Insecta
- Order: Coleoptera
- Suborder: Polyphaga
- Infraorder: Cucujiformia
- Family: Cerambycidae
- Genus: Hedypathes
- Species: H. betulinus

Binomial name
- Hedypathes betulinus (Klug, 1825)

= Hedypathes betulinus =

Species of beetle

Hedypathes betulinus is a species of beetle in the family Cerambycidae. It was described by Johann Christoph Friedrich Klug in 1825.
