= Schizonycha livida =

Scientific classification
- Kingdom: Animalia
- Phylum: Arthropoda
- Clade: Pancrustacea
- Class: Insecta
- Order: Coleoptera
- Suborder: Polyphaga
- Infraorder: Scarabaeiformia
- Family: Scarabaeidae
- Genus: Schizonycha
- Species: S. livida

Binomial name
- Schizonycha livida Klug, 1855

Synonyms
- Schizonycha zambesiana Péringuey, 1904

Species of beetle

Schizonycha livida is a species of beetle of the family Scarabaeidae. It is found in Mozambique.

== Description ==
Adults reach a length of about 14 mm (0.55 in). They are dark testaceous with head and pronotum usually darker. Some specimens are almost fuscous.
