= Subrinus subtilis =

Scientific classification
- Kingdom: Animalia
- Phylum: Arthropoda
- Clade: Pancrustacea
- Class: Insecta
- Order: Coleoptera
- Suborder: Polyphaga
- Infraorder: Scarabaeiformia
- Family: Scarabaeidae
- Genus: Subrinus
- Species: S. subtilis

Binomial name
- Subrinus subtilis (Koshantschikov, 1894)

Synonyms
- Aphodius (Nialus) subtilis Koshantschikov, 1894

Species of beetle

Subrinus subtilis is a species of beetle of the family Scarabaeidae. It is found in Russia.

== Description ==
Adults reach a length of about 3.5 mm (0.14 in). They are very similar to Subrinus sturmi, but the body is somewhat broader and flatter, the pronotum is more strongly and sparsely punctate and the striae of the elytra are somewhat more pronounced.
