= Dactylispa aculeata =

Scientific classification
- Kingdom: Animalia
- Phylum: Arthropoda
- Class: Insecta
- Order: Coleoptera
- Suborder: Polyphaga
- Infraorder: Cucujiformia
- Family: Chrysomelidae
- Genus: Dactylispa
- Species: D. aculeata

Binomial name
- Dactylispa aculeata (Klug, 1835)

Synonyms
- Hispa aculeata Klug, 1835; Hispa laticollis Chapuis, 1877

Species of beetle

Dactylispa aculeata is a species of beetle of the family Chrysomelidae. It is found in Cameroon, Congo, Equatorial Guinea, Guinea, Ivory Coast, Liberia and Nigeria.

== Life history ==
The recorded host plant for this species is Theobroma cacao.
