= Dicentrines sabatinellii =

Scientific classification
- Kingdom: Animalia
- Phylum: Arthropoda
- Class: Insecta
- Order: Coleoptera
- Suborder: Polyphaga
- Infraorder: Scarabaeiformia
- Family: Scarabaeidae
- Genus: Dicentrines
- Species: D. sabatinellii

Binomial name
- Dicentrines sabatinellii Lacroix, 1997

Species of beetle

Dicentrines sabatinellii is a species of beetle of the family Scarabaeidae. It is found in Madagascar.

== Description ==
Adults reach a length of about 4.5 mm (0.18 in). The shape of their body is similar to that of Dicentrines tesserulus, but more elongated and less massive. The upper surface is dark brown with white, oval, dense, scaly hairs.
