= Amorphochelus retusus =

Scientific classification
- Kingdom: Animalia
- Phylum: Arthropoda
- Clade: Pancrustacea
- Class: Insecta
- Order: Coleoptera
- Suborder: Polyphaga
- Infraorder: Scarabaeiformia
- Family: Scarabaeidae
- Genus: Amorphochelus
- Species: A. retusus

Binomial name
- Amorphochelus retusus (Klug, 1834)

Synonyms
- Hoplia retusa Klug, 1834

Species of beetle

Amorphochelus retusus is a species of beetle of the family Scarabaeidae. It is found in Madagascar, as well as on Mauritius and La Réunion.

== Description ==
Adults reach a length of about 6–9 mm (0.24–0.35 in). They have a fairly elongated body. The upper surface is dark brown, almost black with fine hairs.
