= Dicentrines adspersus =

Scientific classification
- Kingdom: Animalia
- Phylum: Arthropoda
- Class: Insecta
- Order: Coleoptera
- Suborder: Polyphaga
- Infraorder: Scarabaeiformia
- Family: Scarabaeidae
- Genus: Dicentrines
- Species: D. adspersus

Binomial name
- Dicentrines adspersus (Klug, 1834)

Synonyms
- Hoplia adspersa Klug, 1834

Species of beetle

Dicentrines adspersus is a species of beetle of the family Scarabaeidae. It is found in Madagascar.

== Description ==
Adults reach a length of about 4.5–5 mm (0.18–0.20 in). They have a short, stocky body. The upper surface is dark brown with elongated, scaly hairs.
