= Dicentrines pumilus =

Scientific classification
- Kingdom: Animalia
- Phylum: Arthropoda
- Class: Insecta
- Order: Coleoptera
- Suborder: Polyphaga
- Infraorder: Scarabaeiformia
- Family: Scarabaeidae
- Genus: Dicentrines
- Species: D. pumilus

Binomial name
- Dicentrines pumilus (Klug, 1834)

Synonyms
- Hoplia pumila Klug, 1834; Microplus cinerascens Blanchard, 1850

Species of beetle

Dicentrines pumilus is a species of beetle of the family Scarabaeidae. It is found in Madagascar.

== Description ==
Adults reach a length of about 4–5 mm (0.16–0.20 in). They have an enlarged, massive body. The upper surface is golden yellow with fine, regular hairs.
