= Icimauna ciliaris =

Scientific classification
- Domain: Eukaryota
- Kingdom: Animalia
- Phylum: Arthropoda
- Class: Insecta
- Order: Coleoptera
- Suborder: Polyphaga
- Infraorder: Cucujiformia
- Family: Cerambycidae
- Tribe: Hemilophini
- Genus: Icimauna
- Species: I. ciliaris

Binomial name
- Icimauna ciliaris (Klug, 1825)

Synonyms
- Hemilophus ciliaris Gemminger & Harold, 1873; Saperda ciliaris Klug, 1825; Spathoptera ciliaris Audinet-Serville, 1835

Species of beetle

Icimauna ciliaris is a species of beetle in the family Cerambycidae. It was described by Johann Christoph Friedrich Klug in 1825. It is known from Argentina, Brazil and Paraguay.
