= Amorphochelus apicalis =

Scientific classification
- Kingdom: Animalia
- Phylum: Arthropoda
- Class: Insecta
- Order: Coleoptera
- Suborder: Polyphaga
- Infraorder: Scarabaeiformia
- Family: Scarabaeidae
- Genus: Amorphochelus
- Species: A. apicalis

Binomial name
- Amorphochelus apicalis Lacroix, 1997

Species of beetle

Amorphochelus apicalis is a species of beetle of the family Scarabaeidae. It is found in Madagascar.

== Description ==
Adults reach a length of about 6–7 mm (0.24–0.28 in). Their body is more elongated than that of similar Amorphochelus difformis. The upper surface is dark brown with abundant hairs.
