= Copelatus pulchellus =

Scientific classification
- Domain: Eukaryota
- Kingdom: Animalia
- Phylum: Arthropoda
- Class: Insecta
- Order: Coleoptera
- Suborder: Adephaga
- Family: Dytiscidae
- Genus: Copelatus
- Species: C. pulchellus

Binomial name
- Copelatus pulchellus (Klug, 1834)

Species of beetle

Copelatus pulchellus is a species of diving beetle. It is part of the subfamily Copelatinae in the family Dytiscidae. It was described by Johann Christoph Friedrich Klug in 1834.
