= Amorphochelus cribrellus =

Scientific classification
- Kingdom: Animalia
- Phylum: Arthropoda
- Class: Insecta
- Order: Coleoptera
- Suborder: Polyphaga
- Infraorder: Scarabaeiformia
- Family: Scarabaeidae
- Genus: Amorphochelus
- Species: A. cribrellus

Binomial name
- Amorphochelus cribrellus (Klug, 1834)

Synonyms
- Hoplia cribrella Klug, 1834

Species of beetle

Amorphochelus cribrellus is a species of beetle of the family Scarabaeidae. It is found in Madagascar.

== Description ==
Adults reach a length of about 4.5–5.5 mm (0.18–0.22 in). They have a short, stocky body. The upper surface is fairly dark brown with fine, short hairs.
