= Sybra geminata =

Scientific classification
- Domain: Eukaryota
- Kingdom: Animalia
- Phylum: Arthropoda
- Class: Insecta
- Order: Coleoptera
- Suborder: Polyphaga
- Infraorder: Cucujiformia
- Family: Cerambycidae
- Genus: Sybra
- Species: S. geminata

Binomial name
- Sybra geminata (Klug, 1833)

Species of beetle

Sybra geminata is a species of beetle in the family Cerambycidae. It was described by Johann Christoph Friedrich Klug in 1833.
