= Ctenodes geniculata =

Scientific classification
- Domain: Eukaryota
- Kingdom: Animalia
- Phylum: Arthropoda
- Class: Insecta
- Order: Coleoptera
- Suborder: Polyphaga
- Infraorder: Cucujiformia
- Family: Cerambycidae
- Genus: Ctenodes
- Species: C. geniculata

Binomial name
- Ctenodes geniculata Klug, 1852

Species of beetle

Ctenodes geniculata is a species of beetle in the family Cerambycidae. It was described by Johann Christoph Friedrich Klug in 1852.
