= Subrinus vitellinus =

Scientific classification
- Kingdom: Animalia
- Phylum: Arthropoda
- Clade: Pancrustacea
- Class: Insecta
- Order: Coleoptera
- Suborder: Polyphaga
- Infraorder: Scarabaeiformia
- Family: Scarabaeidae
- Genus: Subrinus
- Species: S. vitellinus

Binomial name
- Subrinus vitellinus (Klug, 1830)

Synonyms
- Aphodius vitellinus Klug, 1830; Aphodius ephippiger Mulsant, 1870; Aphodius nitens Mulsant & Rey, 1870

Species of beetle

Subrinus vitellinus is a species of beetle of the family Scarabaeidae. It is found in Algeria, Egypt, France, Iran, Iraq, Israel, Italy, Libya, Morocco, Saudi Arabia, Spain, Syria, Tunisia and Ethiopia.

== Description ==
Adults reach a length of about 3–3.5 mm (0.12–0.14 in). They have an elongated, shiny, glabrous, uniformly light yellowish-brown body.
