= Amorphochelus gemmatus =

Scientific classification
- Kingdom: Animalia
- Phylum: Arthropoda
- Class: Insecta
- Order: Coleoptera
- Suborder: Polyphaga
- Infraorder: Scarabaeiformia
- Family: Scarabaeidae
- Genus: Amorphochelus
- Species: A. gemmatus

Binomial name
- Amorphochelus gemmatus (Klug, 1834)

Synonyms
- Hoplia gemmata Klug, 1834; Hoplia irrorata Blanchard, 1850

Species of beetle

Amorphochelus gemmatus is a species of beetle of the family Scarabaeidae. It is found in Madagascar.

== Description ==
Adults reach a length of about 6–8 mm (0.24–0.31 in). They have a short body. The upper surface is dark brown with abundant scaly hairs.
