= Sabatinelloplia contracta =

Scientific classification
- Kingdom: Animalia
- Phylum: Arthropoda
- Class: Insecta
- Order: Coleoptera
- Suborder: Polyphaga
- Infraorder: Scarabaeiformia
- Family: Scarabaeidae
- Genus: Sabatinelloplia
- Species: S. contracta

Binomial name
- Sabatinelloplia contracta (Klug, 1834)

Synonyms
- Monochelus contractus Klug, 1834

Species of beetle

Sabatinelloplia contracta is a species of beetle of the family Scarabaeidae. It is found in Madagascar.

== Description ==
Adults reach a length of about 5.5–7 mm (0.22–0.28 in). They have a short, stocky body. The upper surface is reddish-brown with dense, fine, yellowish scaling.
