= Amorphochelus montanus =

Scientific classification
- Kingdom: Animalia
- Phylum: Arthropoda
- Class: Insecta
- Order: Coleoptera
- Suborder: Polyphaga
- Infraorder: Scarabaeiformia
- Family: Scarabaeidae
- Genus: Amorphochelus
- Species: A. montanus

Binomial name
- Amorphochelus montanus Lacroix, 1997

Species of beetle

Amorphochelus montanus is a species of beetle of the family Scarabaeidae. It is found in Madagascar.

== Description ==
Adults reach a length of about 4.5–5 mm (0.18–0.20 in). They have a fairly short body. The upper surface is orange-brown with dense elongated hairs.
