= Abacetus angustatus =

Scientific classification
- Domain: Eukaryota
- Kingdom: Animalia
- Phylum: Arthropoda
- Class: Insecta
- Order: Coleoptera
- Suborder: Adephaga
- Family: Carabidae
- Genus: Abacetus
- Species: A. angustatus

Binomial name
- Abacetus angustatus Klug, 1853

Synonyms
- Abacetus confusus Straneo, 1944; Abacetus crassicornis Péringuey, 1896; Abacetus nyassae Bates, 1886

Species of beetle

Abacetus angustatus is a species of ground beetle in the subfamily Pterostichinae. It was described by Johann Christoph Friedrich Klug in 1853 and is found in Malawi, Zimbabwe and Mozambique.
