= Amorphochelus fasciculatus =

Scientific classification
- Kingdom: Animalia
- Phylum: Arthropoda
- Class: Insecta
- Order: Coleoptera
- Suborder: Polyphaga
- Infraorder: Scarabaeiformia
- Family: Scarabaeidae
- Genus: Amorphochelus
- Species: A. fasciculatus

Binomial name
- Amorphochelus fasciculatus (Blanchard, 1850)

Synonyms
- Hoplia fasciculata Blanchard, 1850; Hoplia granifera Fairmaire, 1900

Species of beetle

Amorphochelus fasciculatus is a species of beetle of the family Scarabaeidae. It is found in Madagascar.

== Description ==
Adults reach a length of about 8–10 mm (0.31–0.39 in). They have a short, stocky body. The upper surface is dark brown and covered with yellowish scales.
