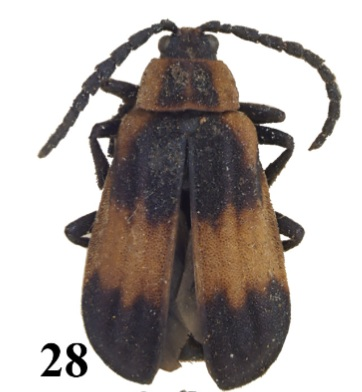
- Schematiza

Scientific classification
- Kingdom: Animalia
- Phylum: Arthropoda
- Clade: Pancrustacea
- Class: Insecta
- Order: Coleoptera
- Suborder: Polyphaga
- Infraorder: Cucujiformia
- Family: Chrysomelidae
- Subfamily: Galerucinae
- Tribe: Galerucini
- Genus: Schematiza; Chevrolat in Dejean, 1836

= Schematiza =

Genus of leaf beetles

Schematiza is a genus of beetles belonging to the family Chrysomelidae.

== Species ==
- Schematiza aequinoctialis Clark, 1865
- Schematiza amplicornis Clark, 1864
- Schematiza aneurica Bechyne, 1956
- Schematiza annulicornis Clark, 1864
- Schematiza antennalis Clark, 1864
- Schematiza apicalis Clark, 1864
- Schematiza apicicornis Jacoby, 1893
- Schematiza bicolor Jacoby, 1887
- Schematiza cearensis Bechyne, 1956
- Schematiza ceramboides Weise, 1921
- Schematiza chontalensis Jacoby, 1887
- Schematiza clarki Jacoby, 1887
- Schematiza collaris Jacoby, 1887
- Schematiza compressicornis (Fabricius, 1801)
- Schematiza emarginata Clark, 1864
- Schematiza exentrica Bechyne, 1956
- Schematiza flavofasciata (Klug, 1829)
- Schematiza frenata Guérin, 1844
- Schematiza funerea Jacoby, 1889
- Schematiza hispiformis Clark, 1864
- Schematiza humeralis Weise, 1921
- Schematiza laevigatus (Fabricius, 1801)
- Schematiza lineaticollis Clark, 1864
- Schematiza lycoides Guérin, 1844
- Schematiza nigricollis Clark, 1864
- Schematiza opposita Bechyne, 1956
- Schematiza rodendentis Bechyne, 1956
- Schematiza sallei Jacoby, 1877
- Schematiza scutellaris Clark, 1864
- Schematiza sesquilutes Bechyne, 1956
- Schematiza suturalis Jacoby, 1887
- Schematiza synchrona Bechyne, 1956
- Schematiza thoracica Jacoby, 1887
- Schematiza venezuelensis Jacoby, 1899
- Schematiza venusta (Clark, 1864)
- Schematiza vicina Clark, 1864
