= Amorphochelus tuberculiferus =

Scientific classification
- Kingdom: Animalia
- Phylum: Arthropoda
- Class: Insecta
- Order: Coleoptera
- Suborder: Polyphaga
- Infraorder: Scarabaeiformia
- Family: Scarabaeidae
- Genus: Amorphochelus
- Species: A. tuberculiferus

Binomial name
- Amorphochelus tuberculiferus Lacroix, 1997

Species of beetle

Amorphochelus tuberculiferus is a species of beetle of the family Scarabaeidae. It is found in Madagascar.

== Description ==
Adults reach a length of about 8–10 mm (0.31–0.39 in). They have an elongated body. The upper surface is very dark, with scaly hairs forming patterns, especially on the pronotum.
