= Lycidola batesi =

Scientific classification
- Domain: Eukaryota
- Kingdom: Animalia
- Phylum: Arthropoda
- Class: Insecta
- Order: Coleoptera
- Suborder: Polyphaga
- Infraorder: Cucujiformia
- Family: Cerambycidae
- Tribe: Hemilophini
- Genus: Lycidola
- Species: L. batesi

Binomial name
- Lycidola batesi Aurivillius, 1923

Species of beetle

Lycidola batesi is a species of beetle in the family Cerambycidae. It was described by Per Olof Christopher Aurivillius in 1923. It is known from Bolivia and Brazil.
