= Dicentrines recavus =

Scientific classification
- Kingdom: Animalia
- Phylum: Arthropoda
- Class: Insecta
- Order: Coleoptera
- Suborder: Polyphaga
- Infraorder: Scarabaeiformia
- Family: Scarabaeidae
- Genus: Dicentrines
- Species: D. recavus

Binomial name
- Dicentrines recavus Lacroix, 1997

Species of beetle

Dicentrines recavus is a species of beetle of the family Scarabaeidae. It is found in Madagascar.

== Description ==
Adults reach a length of about 4–4.5 mm (0.16–0.18 in). They have a rather short, broadened body. The upper surface is uniform reddish-brown, sparsely covered with fine hairs.
