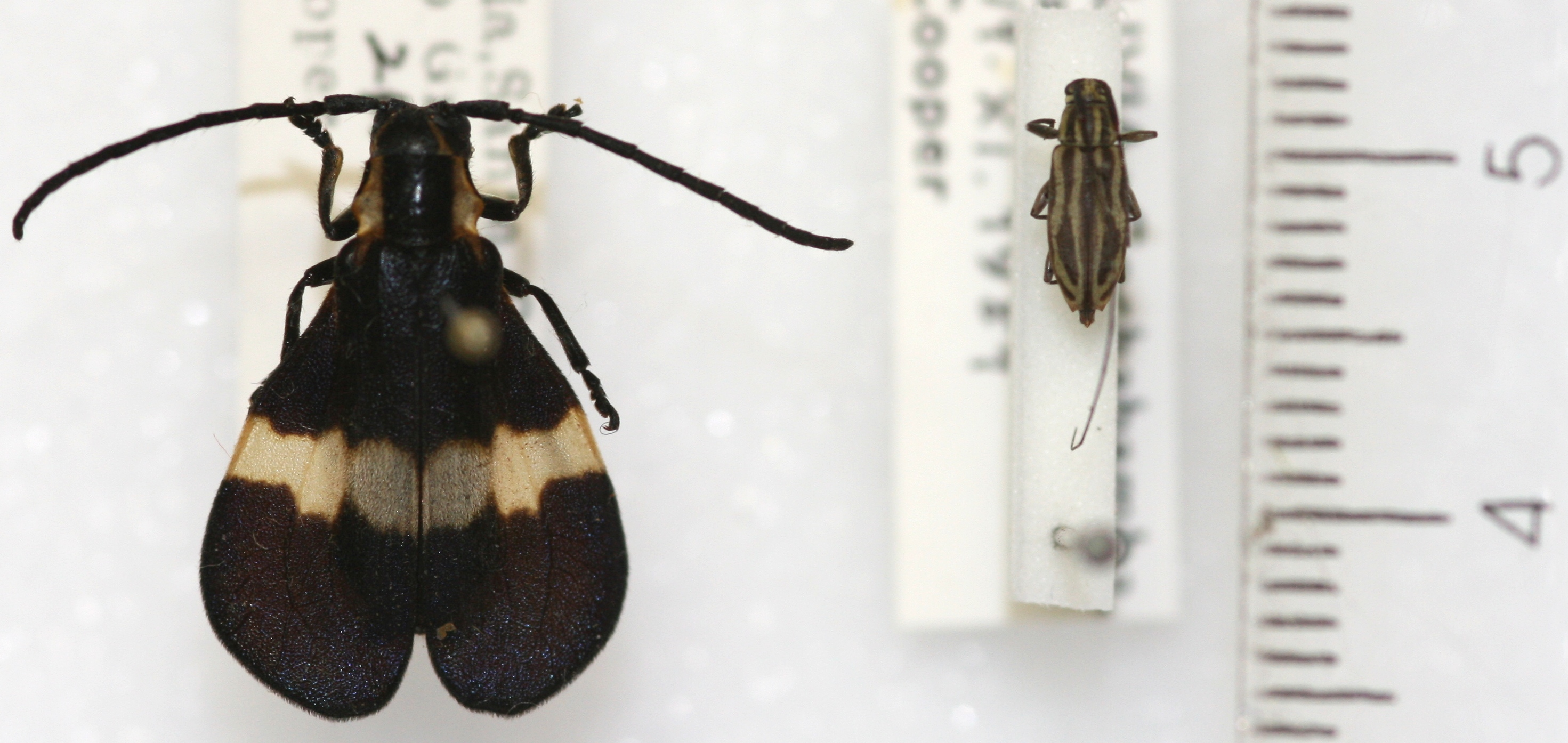

Scientific classification
- Kingdom: Animalia
- Phylum: Arthropoda
- Class: Insecta
- Order: Coleoptera
- Suborder: Polyphaga
- Infraorder: Cucujiformia
- Family: Cerambycidae
- Genus: Lycomimus
- Species: L. albocinctus

Binomial name
- Lycomimus albocinctus Melzer, 1931

= Lycomimus albocinctus =

Species of beetle

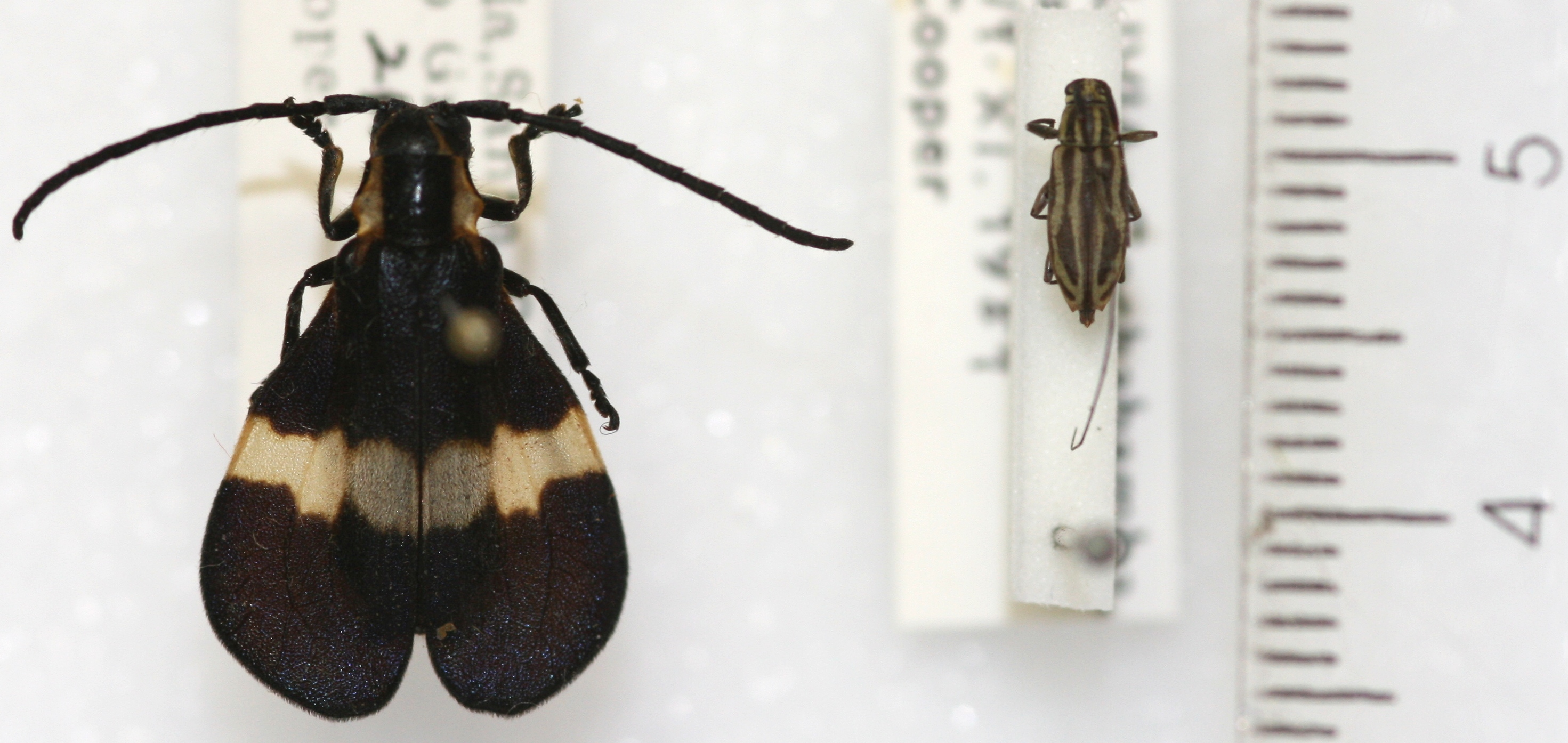

Lycomimus albocinctus is a species of beetle in the family Cerambycidae. It was described by Melzer in 1931. It is known from Brazil and French Guiana.
