= Amorphochelus nigrescens =

Scientific classification
- Kingdom: Animalia
- Phylum: Arthropoda
- Class: Insecta
- Order: Coleoptera
- Suborder: Polyphaga
- Infraorder: Scarabaeiformia
- Family: Scarabaeidae
- Genus: Amorphochelus
- Species: A. nigrescens

Binomial name
- Amorphochelus nigrescens (Blanchard, 1850)

Synonyms
- Hoplia nigrescens Blanchard, 1850

Species of beetle

Amorphochelus nigrescens is a species of beetle of the family Scarabaeidae. It is found in Madagascar.

== Description ==
Adults reach a length of about 4.5–5.5 mm (0.18–0.22 in). They have a short, fairly stocky body. The upper surface is reddish-brown with fine hairs.
