= Lycidola simulatrix =

Scientific classification
- Domain: Eukaryota
- Kingdom: Animalia
- Phylum: Arthropoda
- Class: Insecta
- Order: Coleoptera
- Suborder: Polyphaga
- Infraorder: Cucujiformia
- Family: Cerambycidae
- Tribe: Hemilophini
- Genus: Lycidola
- Species: L. simulatrix

Binomial name
- Lycidola simulatrix Bates, 1866

Synonyms
- Hemilophus simulatrix Gemminger & Harold, 1873

Species of beetle

Lycidola simulatrix is a species of beetle in the family Cerambycidae. It was described by Henry Walter Bates in 1866. It is known from French Guiana and Brazil.
