= Amorphochelus fuscopunctatus =

Scientific classification
- Kingdom: Animalia
- Phylum: Arthropoda
- Class: Insecta
- Order: Coleoptera
- Suborder: Polyphaga
- Infraorder: Scarabaeiformia
- Family: Scarabaeidae
- Genus: Amorphochelus
- Species: A. fuscopunctatus

Binomial name
- Amorphochelus fuscopunctatus (Fairmaire, 1897)

Synonyms
- Hoplia fuscopunctata Fairmaire, 1897

Species of beetle

Amorphochelus fuscopunctatus is a species of beetle of the family Scarabaeidae. It is found in Madagascar.

== Description ==
Adults reach a length of about 6–7 mm (0.24–0.28 in). They have a short body. The upper surface is dark brown with round, white, scaly hairs.
