= Lycidola =

Scientific classification
- Domain: Eukaryota
- Kingdom: Animalia
- Phylum: Arthropoda
- Class: Insecta
- Order: Coleoptera
- Suborder: Polyphaga
- Infraorder: Cucujiformia
- Family: Cerambycidae
- Tribe: Hemilophini
- Genus: Lycidola; Thomson, 1864

Type species
- Saperda palliata Klug, 1825

Genus of beetles

Lycidola is a genus of longhorn beetles of the subfamily Lamiinae, containing the following species:

- Lycidola batesi Aurivillius, 1923
- Lycidola beltii Bates, 1872
- Lycidola expansa Bates, 1881
- Lycidola felix Waterhouse, 1880
- Lycidola flavofasciata Waterhouse, 1880
- Lycidola palliata (Klug, 1825)
- Lycidola popeba Galileo & Martins, 2006
- Lycidola simulatrix Bates, 1866
