= Amorphochelus fairmairei =

Scientific classification
- Kingdom: Animalia
- Phylum: Arthropoda
- Class: Insecta
- Order: Coleoptera
- Suborder: Polyphaga
- Infraorder: Scarabaeiformia
- Family: Scarabaeidae
- Genus: Amorphochelus
- Species: A. fairmairei

Binomial name
- Amorphochelus fairmairei (Dalla Torre, 1913)

Synonyms
- Hoplia fairmairei Dalla Torre, 1913; Hoplia albosparsa Fairmaire, 1903 (preocc.)

Species of beetle

Amorphochelus fairmairei is a species of beetle of the family Scarabaeidae. It is found in Madagascar.

== Description ==
Adults reach a length of about 6.5 mm (0.26 in). They have a short body. The upper surface is reddish-brown with sparse, fine hairs.
