= Dicentrines pallidulus =

Scientific classification
- Kingdom: Animalia
- Phylum: Arthropoda
- Class: Insecta
- Order: Coleoptera
- Suborder: Polyphaga
- Infraorder: Scarabaeiformia
- Family: Scarabaeidae
- Genus: Dicentrines
- Species: D. pallidulus

Binomial name
- Dicentrines pallidulus Burmeister, 1844

Species of beetle

Dicentrines pallidulus is a species of beetle of the family Scarabaeidae. It is found in Madagascar.

== Description ==
Adults reach a length of about 3–4 mm (0.12–0.16 in). They have an elongated, narrow body. The upper surface is light golden yellow with fine, regular, sparse hairs.
