= Amorphochelus =

Scientific classification
- Kingdom: Animalia
- Phylum: Arthropoda
- Class: Insecta
- Order: Coleoptera
- Suborder: Polyphaga
- Infraorder: Scarabaeiformia
- Family: Scarabaeidae
- Subfamily: Melolonthinae
- Tribe: Hopliini
- Genus: Amorphochelus; Fairmaire, 1898

Genus beetles

Amorphochelus is a genus of beetles belonging to the family Scarabaeidae.

== Species ==
- Amorphochelus andringitrensis Lacroix, 1997
- Amorphochelus apicalis Lacroix, 1997
- Amorphochelus bilobus Lacroix, 1997
- Amorphochelus breviarius Lacroix, 1997
- Amorphochelus collaris Lacroix, 1997
- Amorphochelus crenatus Lacroix, 1997
- Amorphochelus cribrellus (Klug, 1834)
- Amorphochelus delicatus Lacroix, 1997
- Amorphochelus difformis (Fairmaire, 1903)
- Amorphochelus ebenus Lacroix, 1997
- Amorphochelus fairmairei (Dalla Torre, 1913)
- Amorphochelus fasciculatus (Blanchard, 1850)
- Amorphochelus furvus Lacroix, 1997
- Amorphochelus fuscopunctatus (Fairmaire, 1897)
- Amorphochelus gemmatus (Klug, 1834)
- Amorphochelus granulosus Lacroix, 1997
- Amorphochelus griseolus Lacroix, 1997
- Amorphochelus griseovarius Lacroix, 1997
- Amorphochelus grumosus Lacroix, 1997
- Amorphochelus gruveli Lacroix, 1997
- Amorphochelus insulatus Lacroix, 1997
- Amorphochelus limatus Lacroix, 1997
- Amorphochelus lokobensis Lacroix, 1997
- Amorphochelus meridionalis Lacroix, 1997
- Amorphochelus micheli Lacroix, 1997
- Amorphochelus milloti Lacroix, 1997
- Amorphochelus minutulus Lacroix, 1997
- Amorphochelus minutus Lacroix, 1997
- Amorphochelus montanus Lacroix, 1997
- Amorphochelus nigrescens (Blanchard, 1850)
- Amorphochelus nudus Lacroix, 1997
- Amorphochelus paulus Lacroix, 1997
- Amorphochelus perrieri Fairmaire, 1898
- Amorphochelus raharizoninai Lacroix, 1998
- Amorphochelus retusus (Klug, 1834)
- Amorphochelus scitulus Lacroix, 1997
- Amorphochelus sinuatipennis Lacroix, 1997
- Amorphochelus sogai Lacroix, 1997
- Amorphochelus tuberculatus (Blanchard, 1850)
- Amorphochelus tuberculiferus Lacroix, 1997
- Amorphochelus verrucosus Lacroix, 1997
