= Amorphochelus nudus =

Scientific classification
- Kingdom: Animalia
- Phylum: Arthropoda
- Class: Insecta
- Order: Coleoptera
- Suborder: Polyphaga
- Infraorder: Scarabaeiformia
- Family: Scarabaeidae
- Genus: Amorphochelus
- Species: A. nudus

Binomial name
- Amorphochelus nudus Lacroix, 1997

Species of beetle

Amorphochelus nudus is a species of beetle of the family Scarabaeidae. It is found in Madagascar.

== Description ==
Adults reach a length of about 7–8 mm (0.28–0.31 in). They have a rather elongated body. The upper surface is fairly light brown with fine hairs.
