= Icimauna macilenta =

Scientific classification
- Domain: Eukaryota
- Kingdom: Animalia
- Phylum: Arthropoda
- Class: Insecta
- Order: Coleoptera
- Suborder: Polyphaga
- Infraorder: Cucujiformia
- Family: Cerambycidae
- Tribe: Hemilophini
- Genus: Icimauna
- Species: I. macilenta

Binomial name
- Icimauna macilenta (Bates, 1881)

Synonyms
- Hemilophus macilentus Lameere, 1883; Tyrinthia macilenta Bates, 1881

Species of beetle

Icimauna macilenta is a species of beetle in the family Cerambycidae. It was described by Henry Walter Bates in 1881. It is known from Brazil.
