= Amorphochelus meridionalis =

Scientific classification
- Kingdom: Animalia
- Phylum: Arthropoda
- Class: Insecta
- Order: Coleoptera
- Suborder: Polyphaga
- Infraorder: Scarabaeiformia
- Family: Scarabaeidae
- Genus: Amorphochelus
- Species: A. meridionalis

Binomial name
- Amorphochelus meridionalis Lacroix, 1997

Species of beetle

Amorphochelus meridionalis is a species of beetle of the family Scarabaeidae. It is found in Madagascar.

== Description ==
Adults reach a length of about 7–8 mm (0.28–0.31 in). They have a fairly elongated body. The upper surface is chestnut-brown with fine but dense hairs.
