= Icimauna =

Scientific classification
- Domain: Eukaryota
- Kingdom: Animalia
- Phylum: Arthropoda
- Class: Insecta
- Order: Coleoptera
- Suborder: Polyphaga
- Infraorder: Cucujiformia
- Family: Cerambycidae
- Tribe: Hemilophini
- Genus: Icimauna

Genus of beetles

Icimauna is a genus of longhorn beetles of the subfamily Lamiinae, containing the following species:

- Icimauna angaba Martins & Galileo, 1991
- Icimauna aysa Martins & Galileo, 1991
- Icimauna ciliaris (Klug, 1825)
- Icimauna macilenta (Bates, 1881)
- Icimauna pallidipennis Martins & Galileo, 2007
- Icimauna reversa (Bates, 1881)
- Icimauna sarauaia Martins & Galileo, 1991
