= Dicentrines lineaticollis =

Scientific classification
- Kingdom: Animalia
- Phylum: Arthropoda
- Class: Insecta
- Order: Coleoptera
- Suborder: Polyphaga
- Infraorder: Scarabaeiformia
- Family: Scarabaeidae
- Genus: Dicentrines
- Species: D. lineaticollis

Binomial name
- Dicentrines lineaticollis Burmeister, 1844

Species of beetle

Dicentrines lineaticollis is a species of beetle of the family Scarabaeidae. It is found in Madagascar.

== Description ==
Adults reach a length of about 4.5–5.5 mm (0.18–0.22 in). They have an elongated body. The upper surface is brownish-yellow with fine, more or less scaly hairs and with a darker pronotum.
