= Dicentrines limbatus =

Scientific classification
- Kingdom: Animalia
- Phylum: Arthropoda
- Class: Insecta
- Order: Coleoptera
- Suborder: Polyphaga
- Infraorder: Scarabaeiformia
- Family: Scarabaeidae
- Genus: Dicentrines
- Species: D. limbatus

Binomial name
- Dicentrines limbatus Lacroix, 1997

Species of beetle

Dicentrines limbatus is a species of beetle of the family Scarabaeidae. It is found in Madagascar.

== Description ==
Adults reach a length of about 4–5 mm (0.16–0.20 in). They have a fairly massive body. The upper surface is yellowish-brown with fairly dense, whitish, scaly hairs.
