= Amorphochelus bilobus =

Scientific classification
- Kingdom: Animalia
- Phylum: Arthropoda
- Class: Insecta
- Order: Coleoptera
- Suborder: Polyphaga
- Infraorder: Scarabaeiformia
- Family: Scarabaeidae
- Genus: Amorphochelus
- Species: A. bilobus

Binomial name
- Amorphochelus bilobus Lacroix, 1997

Species of beetle

Amorphochelus bilobus is a species of beetle of the family Scarabaeidae. It is found in Madagascar.

== Description ==
Adults reach a length of about 6–6.5 mm (0.24–0.26 in). They have a short body. The upper surface is reddish-brown with dense, elongated, whitish, scaly hairs.
