= Ctenodes guianensis =

Scientific classification
- Domain: Eukaryota
- Kingdom: Animalia
- Phylum: Arthropoda
- Class: Insecta
- Order: Coleoptera
- Suborder: Polyphaga
- Infraorder: Cucujiformia
- Family: Cerambycidae
- Genus: Ctenodes
- Species: C. guianensis

Binomial name
- Ctenodes guianensis Tavakilian & Touroult, 2009

Species of beetle

Ctenodes guianensis is a species of beetle in the family Cerambycidae. It was described by Tavakilian & Touroult in 2009.
