= Protorhopala picta =

Scientific classification
- Kingdom: Animalia
- Phylum: Arthropoda
- Class: Insecta
- Order: Coleoptera
- Suborder: Polyphaga
- Infraorder: Cucujiformia
- Family: Cerambycidae
- Genus: Protorhopala
- Species: P. picta

Binomial name
- Protorhopala picta (Fairmaire, 1899)

Species of beetle

Protorhopala picta is a species of beetle in the family Cerambycidae. It was described by Léon Fairmaire in 1899.
