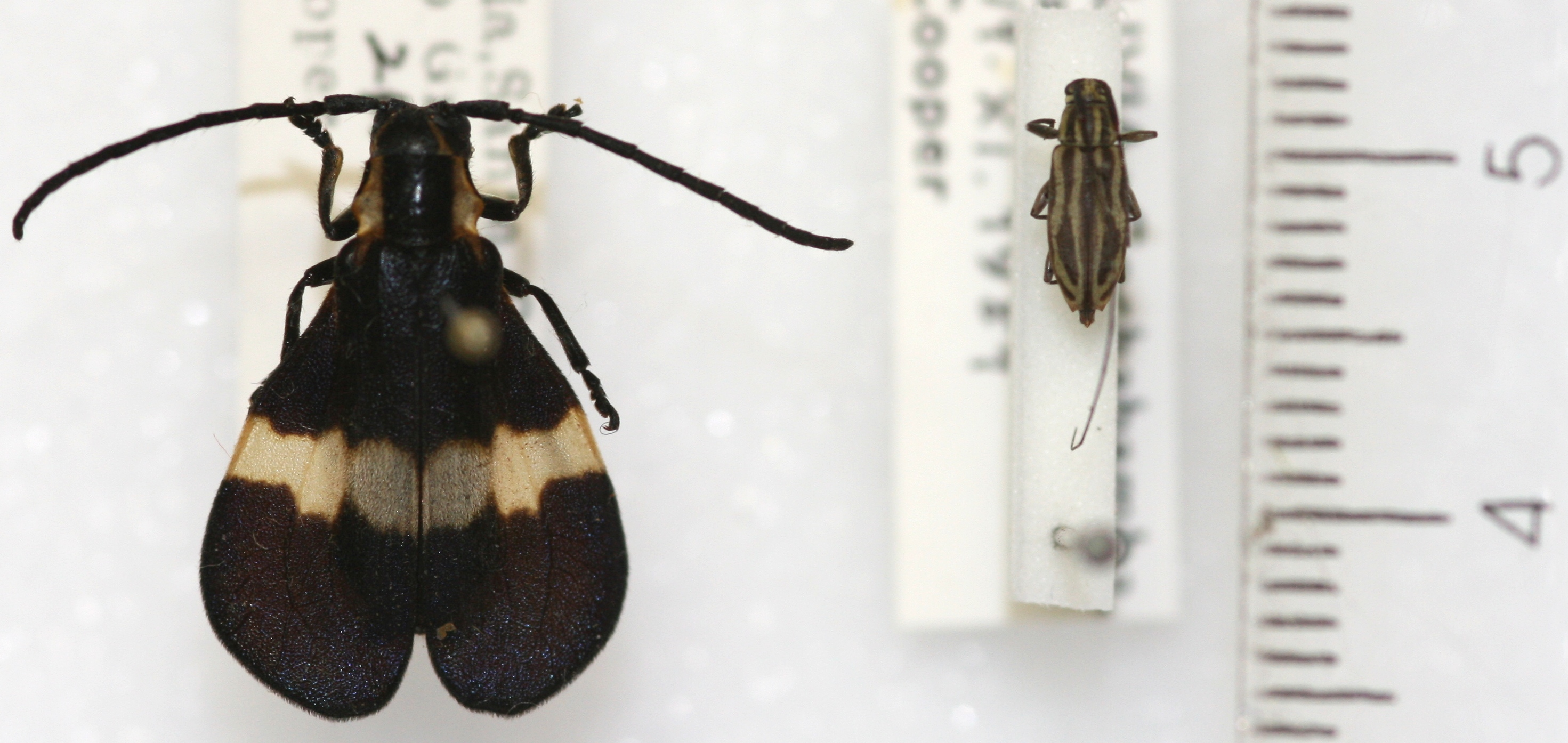
- Lycomimus albocinctus

Scientific classification
- Kingdom: Animalia
- Phylum: Arthropoda
- Class: Insecta
- Order: Coleoptera
- Suborder: Polyphaga
- Infraorder: Cucujiformia
- Family: Cerambycidae
- Subfamily: Lamiinae
- Tribe: Hemilophini
- Genus: Lycomimus; Melzer, 1931

= Lycomimus =

Genus of beetles

Lycomimus is a genus of longhorn beetles of the subfamily Lamiinae, containing the following species:

- Lycomimus albocinctus Melzer, 1931
- Lycomimus ampliatus (Klug, 1825)
- Lycomimus formosus (Chemsak & Linsley, 1984)
