= Apeba =

Scientific classification
- Domain: Eukaryota
- Kingdom: Animalia
- Phylum: Arthropoda
- Class: Insecta
- Order: Coleoptera
- Suborder: Polyphaga
- Infraorder: Cucujiformia
- Family: Cerambycidae
- Subfamily: Lamiinae
- Tribe: Hemilophini
- Genus: Apeba; Martins & Galileo, 1991

Genus of beetles

Apeba is a genus of flat-faced longhorns in the beetle family Cerambycidae. There are about six described species in Apeba, found in Central and South America.

== Species ==
These six species belong to the genus Apeba:

- Apeba barauna Martins & Galileo, 1991 (Brazil)
- Apeba danielvlasaki Vlasák & Santos-Silva, 2020 (Ecuador)
- Apeba herrerae Galileo, Santos-Silva & Wappes, 2017 (Bolivia)
- Apeba isabellina (Bates, 1885) (Panama)
- Apeba popeba (Galileo & Martins, 2006) (Costa Rica)
- Apeba togata (Klug, 1825) (Brazil)
