= Icimauna sarauaia =

Scientific classification
- Domain: Eukaryota
- Kingdom: Animalia
- Phylum: Arthropoda
- Class: Insecta
- Order: Coleoptera
- Suborder: Polyphaga
- Infraorder: Cucujiformia
- Family: Cerambycidae
- Tribe: Hemilophini
- Genus: Icimauna
- Species: I. sarauaia

Binomial name
- Icimauna sarauaia Martins & Galileo, 1991

Species of beetle

Icimauna sarauaia is a species of beetle in the family Cerambycidae. It was described by Martins and Galileo in 1991. It is known from Brazil and Bolivia.
