= Ctenodes =

Scientific classification
- Domain: Eukaryota
- Kingdom: Animalia
- Phylum: Arthropoda
- Class: Insecta
- Order: Coleoptera
- Suborder: Polyphaga
- Infraorder: Cucujiformia
- Family: Cerambycidae
- Subfamily: Cerambycinae
- Tribe: Trachyderini
- Genus: Ctenodes; Olivier, 1807

Genus of beetles

Ctenodes is a genus of beetles in the family Cerambycidae, containing the following species:

- Ctenodes decemmaculata Olivier, 1807
- Ctenodes geniculata Klug, 1825
- Ctenodes guianensis Dalens, Tavakilian & Touroult, 2009
- Ctenodes zonata Klug, 1825
