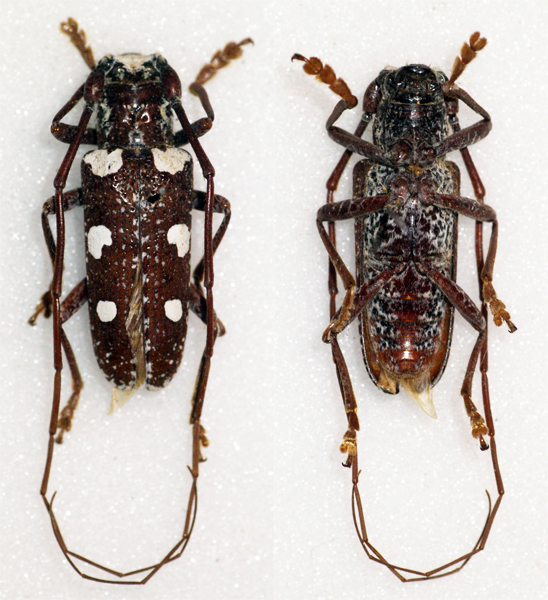

Scientific classification
- Kingdom: Animalia
- Phylum: Arthropoda
- Class: Insecta
- Order: Coleoptera
- Suborder: Polyphaga
- Infraorder: Cucujiformia
- Family: Cerambycidae
- Tribe: Pteropliini
- Genus: Protorhopala

= Protorhopala =

Genus of beetles

Protorhopala is a genus of longhorn beetles of the subfamily Lamiinae, containing the following species:

- Protorhopala elegans Pascoe, 1875
- Protorhopala picta (Fairmaire, 1899)
- Protorhopala sexnotata (Klug, 1833)
