= Dicentrines lineatus =

Scientific classification
- Kingdom: Animalia
- Phylum: Arthropoda
- Class: Insecta
- Order: Coleoptera
- Suborder: Polyphaga
- Infraorder: Scarabaeiformia
- Family: Scarabaeidae
- Genus: Dicentrines
- Species: D. lineatus

Binomial name
- Dicentrines lineatus Blanchard, 1850

Species of beetle

Dicentrines lineatus is a species of beetle of the family Scarabaeidae. It is found in Madagascar.

== Description ==
Adults reach a length of about 3.5–4 mm (0.14–0.16 in). They have a not very elongated body. The upper surface is dark brown with elongated scaly hairs.
