= Apeba barauna =

Scientific classification
- Domain: Eukaryota
- Kingdom: Animalia
- Phylum: Arthropoda
- Class: Insecta
- Order: Coleoptera
- Suborder: Polyphaga
- Infraorder: Cucujiformia
- Family: Cerambycidae
- Subfamily: Lamiinae
- Tribe: Hemilophini
- Genus: Apeba
- Species: A. barauna

Binomial name
- Apeba barauna Martins & Galileo, 1991

Species of beetle

Apeba barauna is a species of longhorned beetle in the family Cerambycidae. It was described by Martins and Galileo in 1991. It is known from Brazil.
