= Amorphochelus milloti =

Scientific classification
- Kingdom: Animalia
- Phylum: Arthropoda
- Class: Insecta
- Order: Coleoptera
- Suborder: Polyphaga
- Infraorder: Scarabaeiformia
- Family: Scarabaeidae
- Genus: Amorphochelus
- Species: A. milloti

Binomial name
- Amorphochelus milloti Lacroix, 1997

Species of beetle

Amorphochelus milloti is a species of beetle of the family Scarabaeidae. It is found in Madagascar.

== Description ==
Adults reach a length of about 6–6.5 mm (0.24–0.26 in). They have a rather elongated body. The scales on the upper surface form longitudinal bands.
