= Lycomimus formosus =

Scientific classification
- Kingdom: Animalia
- Phylum: Arthropoda
- Class: Insecta
- Order: Coleoptera
- Suborder: Polyphaga
- Infraorder: Cucujiformia
- Family: Cerambycidae
- Genus: Lycomimus
- Species: L. formosus

Binomial name
- Lycomimus formosus (Chemsak & Linsley, 1984)

Synonyms
- Lycomimus formosa Chemsak, Linsley & Noguera, 1992

Species of beetle

Lycomimus formosus is a species of beetle in the family Cerambycidae. It was described by Chemsak and Linsley in 1984. It is known from Panama.
