= Dicentrines pumilissimus =

Scientific classification
- Kingdom: Animalia
- Phylum: Arthropoda
- Class: Insecta
- Order: Coleoptera
- Suborder: Polyphaga
- Infraorder: Scarabaeiformia
- Family: Scarabaeidae
- Genus: Dicentrines
- Species: D. pumilissimus

Binomial name
- Dicentrines pumilissimus Lacroix, 1997

Species of beetle

Dicentrines pumilissimus is a species of beetle of the family Scarabaeidae. It is found in Madagascar.

== Description ==
Adults reach a length of about 3.5–4 mm (0.14–0.16 in). They have an elongated, rather narrow body. The upper surface is reddish-brown with fine, dense, white hairs.
