= Dicentrines patagiatus =

Scientific classification
- Kingdom: Animalia
- Phylum: Arthropoda
- Clade: Pancrustacea
- Class: Insecta
- Order: Coleoptera
- Suborder: Polyphaga
- Infraorder: Scarabaeiformia
- Family: Scarabaeidae
- Genus: Dicentrines
- Species: D. patagiatus

Binomial name
- Dicentrines patagiatus Lacroix, 1997

Species of beetle

Dicentrines patagiatus is a species of beetle of the family Scarabaeidae. It is found in Madagascar.

== Description ==
Adults reach a length of about 4 mm (0.16 in). They have a fairly rounded body. The upper surface is brownish-orange with fine, sparse hairs.
