= Amorphochelus grumosus =

Scientific classification
- Kingdom: Animalia
- Phylum: Arthropoda
- Class: Insecta
- Order: Coleoptera
- Suborder: Polyphaga
- Infraorder: Scarabaeiformia
- Family: Scarabaeidae
- Genus: Amorphochelus
- Species: A. grumosus

Binomial name
- Amorphochelus grumosus Lacroix, 1997

Species of beetle

Amorphochelus grumosus is a species of beetle of the family Scarabaeidae. It is found in Madagascar.

== Description ==
Adults reach a length of about 6–9 mm (0.24–0.35 in). They have a slightly elongated body. The upper surface is dark brown with dense squamous hairs, except at the elytral apex.
