= Protorhopala elegans =

Scientific classification
- Kingdom: Animalia
- Phylum: Arthropoda
- Class: Insecta
- Order: Coleoptera
- Suborder: Polyphaga
- Infraorder: Cucujiformia
- Family: Cerambycidae
- Genus: Protorhopala
- Species: P. elegans

Binomial name
- Protorhopala elegans Pascoe, 1875

Species of beetle

Protorhopala elegans is a species of beetle in the family Cerambycidae. It was described by Francis Polkinghorne Pascoe in 1875. It is known from Madagascar.
