= Amorphochelus tuberculatus =

Scientific classification
- Kingdom: Animalia
- Phylum: Arthropoda
- Class: Insecta
- Order: Coleoptera
- Suborder: Polyphaga
- Infraorder: Scarabaeiformia
- Family: Scarabaeidae
- Genus: Amorphochelus
- Species: A. tuberculatus

Binomial name
- Amorphochelus tuberculatus (Blanchard, 1850)

Synonyms
- Hoplia tuberculata Blanchard, 1850

Species of beetle

Amorphochelus tuberculatus is a species of beetle of the family Scarabaeidae. It is found in Madagascar.

== Description ==
Adults reach a length of about 6–6.5 mm (0.24–0.26 in). They have a short, oval body. The upper surface is dark brown with fairly abundant hairs.
