= Amorphochelus perrieri =

Scientific classification
- Kingdom: Animalia
- Phylum: Arthropoda
- Class: Insecta
- Order: Coleoptera
- Suborder: Polyphaga
- Infraorder: Scarabaeiformia
- Family: Scarabaeidae
- Genus: Amorphochelus
- Species: A. perrieri

Binomial name
- Amorphochelus perrieri Fairmaire, 1898

Species of beetle

Amorphochelus perrieri is a species of beetle of the family Scarabaeidae. It is found in Madagascar.

== Description ==
Adults reach a length of about 8–9 mm (0.31–0.35 in). They have a massive body. The upper surface is dark brown and covered with mostly whitish scales.
