= Amorphochelus verrucosus =

Scientific classification
- Kingdom: Animalia
- Phylum: Arthropoda
- Class: Insecta
- Order: Coleoptera
- Suborder: Polyphaga
- Infraorder: Scarabaeiformia
- Family: Scarabaeidae
- Genus: Amorphochelus
- Species: A. verrucosus

Binomial name
- Amorphochelus verrucosus Lacroix, 1997

Species of beetle

Amorphochelus verrucosus is a species of beetle of the family Scarabaeidae. It is found in Madagascar.

== Description ==
Adults reach a length of about 7 mm (0.28 in). They have a fairly elongated body. The upper surface is very dark brown with fine, white scales.
