= Amorphochelus collaris =

Scientific classification
- Kingdom: Animalia
- Phylum: Arthropoda
- Class: Insecta
- Order: Coleoptera
- Suborder: Polyphaga
- Infraorder: Scarabaeiformia
- Family: Scarabaeidae
- Genus: Amorphochelus
- Species: A. collaris

Binomial name
- Amorphochelus collaris Lacroix, 1997

Species of beetle

Amorphochelus collaris is a species of beetle of the family Scarabaeidae. It is found in Madagascar.

== Description ==
Adults reach a length of about 5 mm (0.20 in). They have a rather elongated body. The upper surface has fine, sparse hairs forming patterns.
