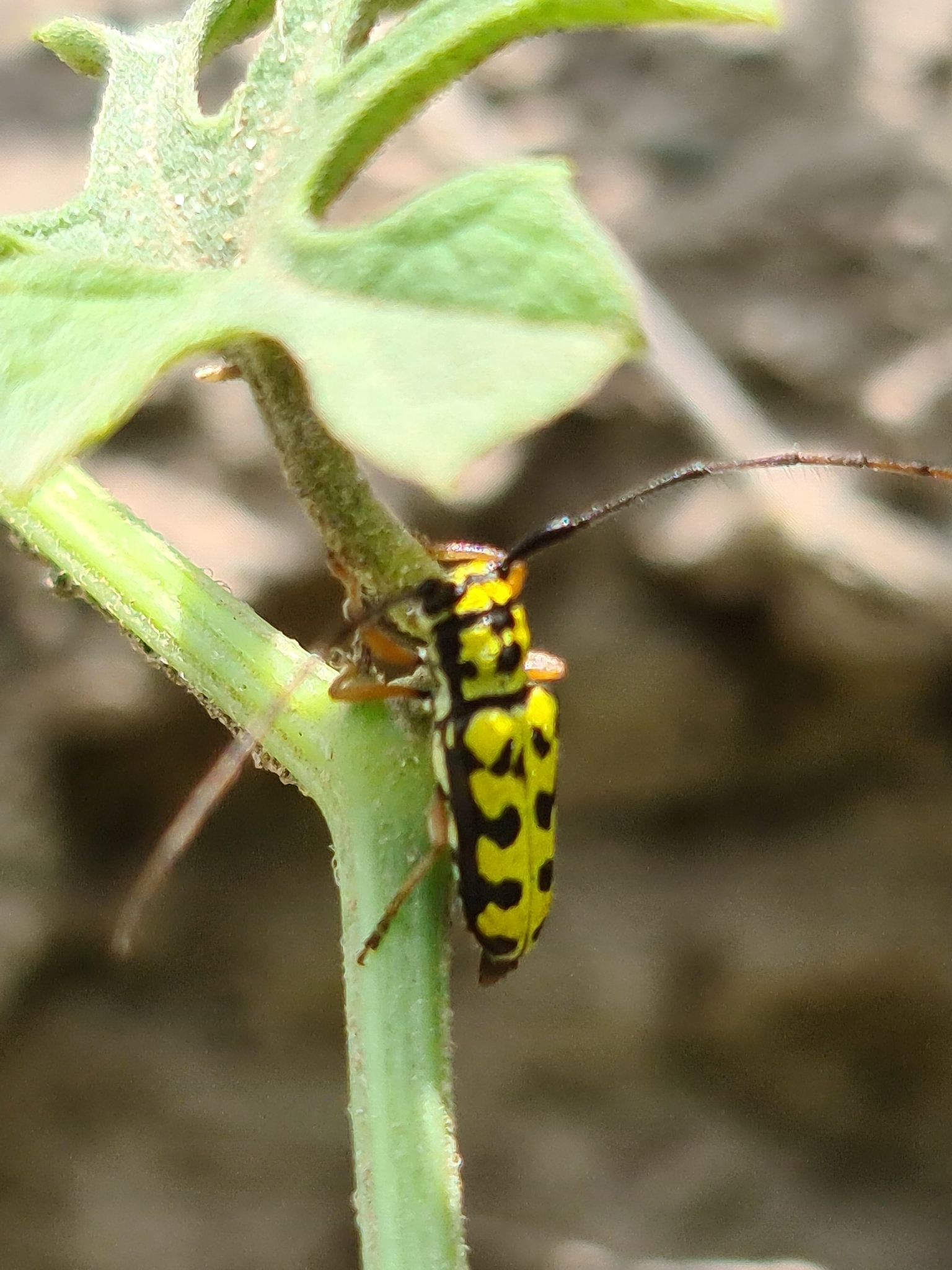
- Zeale nigromaculata, Argentina

Scientific classification
- Kingdom: Animalia
- Phylum: Arthropoda
- Class: Insecta
- Order: Coleoptera
- Suborder: Polyphaga
- Infraorder: Cucujiformia
- Family: Cerambycidae
- Subfamily: Lamiinae
- Tribe: Hemilophini
- Genus: Zeale; Pascoe, 1866

= Zeale =

Genus of beetles

Zeale is a genus of flat-faced longhorns in the beetle family Cerambycidae. There are at least four described species in Zeale, found in Central and South America.

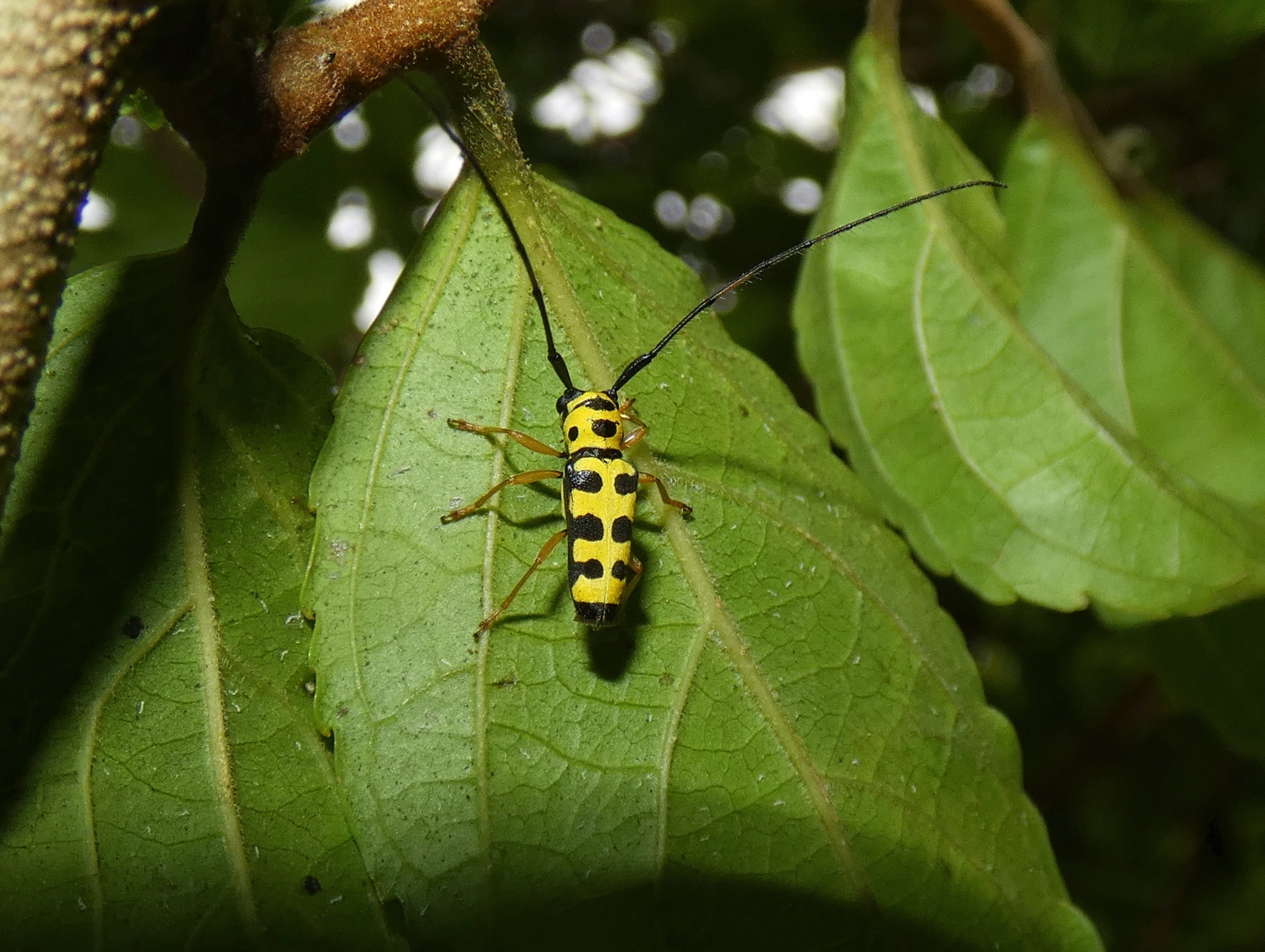
Zeale scalaris, Panamá

== Species ==
These four species belong to the genus Zeale:

- Zeale dubia Galileo & Martins, 1997
- Zeale granvillei Touroult & Dalens, 2015
- Zeale nigromaculata (Klug, 1829)
- Zeale scalaris Pascoe, 1866
