= Subrinus clermonti =

Scientific classification
- Kingdom: Animalia
- Phylum: Arthropoda
- Clade: Pancrustacea
- Class: Insecta
- Order: Coleoptera
- Suborder: Polyphaga
- Infraorder: Scarabaeiformia
- Family: Scarabaeidae
- Genus: Subrinus
- Species: S. clermonti

Binomial name
- Subrinus clermonti (Reitter, 1907)

Synonyms
- Aphodius (Calamosternus) clermonti Reitter, 1907

Species of beetle

Subrinus clermonti is a species of beetle of the family Scarabaeidae. It is found in Armenia, Azerbaijan, Iran, Iraq, Turkey and Turkmenistan.

== Description ==
Adults reach a length of about 3.5–4 mm (0.14–0.16 in). They have a moderately convex, shiny, glabrous, blackish-brown body, with the margins of the head and the sides of the pronotum reddish-brown. The scutellum and elytra are light reddish-brown and the legs are reddish-brown.
