= Sabatinelloplia =

Scientific classification
- Kingdom: Animalia
- Phylum: Arthropoda
- Class: Insecta
- Order: Coleoptera
- Suborder: Polyphaga
- Infraorder: Scarabaeiformia
- Family: Scarabaeidae
- Subfamily: Melolonthinae
- Tribe: Hopliini
- Genus: Sabatinelloplia; Lacroix, 1998

Genus beetles

Sabatinelloplia is a genus of beetles belonging to the family Scarabaeidae.

== Species ==
- Sabatinelloplia contracta (Klug, 1834)
- Sabatinelloplia ovata Lacroix, 1998
