= Amorphochelus micheli =

Scientific classification
- Kingdom: Animalia
- Phylum: Arthropoda
- Class: Insecta
- Order: Coleoptera
- Suborder: Polyphaga
- Infraorder: Scarabaeiformia
- Family: Scarabaeidae
- Genus: Amorphochelus
- Species: A. micheli

Binomial name
- Amorphochelus micheli Lacroix, 1997

Species of beetle

Amorphochelus micheli is a species of beetle of the family Scarabaeidae. It is found in Madagascar.

== Description ==
Adults reach a length of about 6.5–7 mm (0.26–0.28 in). They have a short body. The upper surface is reddish-brown with sparse hairs.
