= Lycidola beltii =

Scientific classification
- Domain: Eukaryota
- Kingdom: Animalia
- Phylum: Arthropoda
- Class: Insecta
- Order: Coleoptera
- Suborder: Polyphaga
- Infraorder: Cucujiformia
- Family: Cerambycidae
- Tribe: Hemilophini
- Genus: Lycidola
- Species: L. beltii

Binomial name
- Lycidola beltii Bates, 1872

Synonyms
- Hemilophus belti Gemminger & Harold, 1873; Lycidola belti Bates, 1881

Species of beetle

Lycidola beltii is a species of beetle in the family Cerambycidae. It was described by Henry Walter Bates in 1872. It is known from Nicaragua and Honduras.
