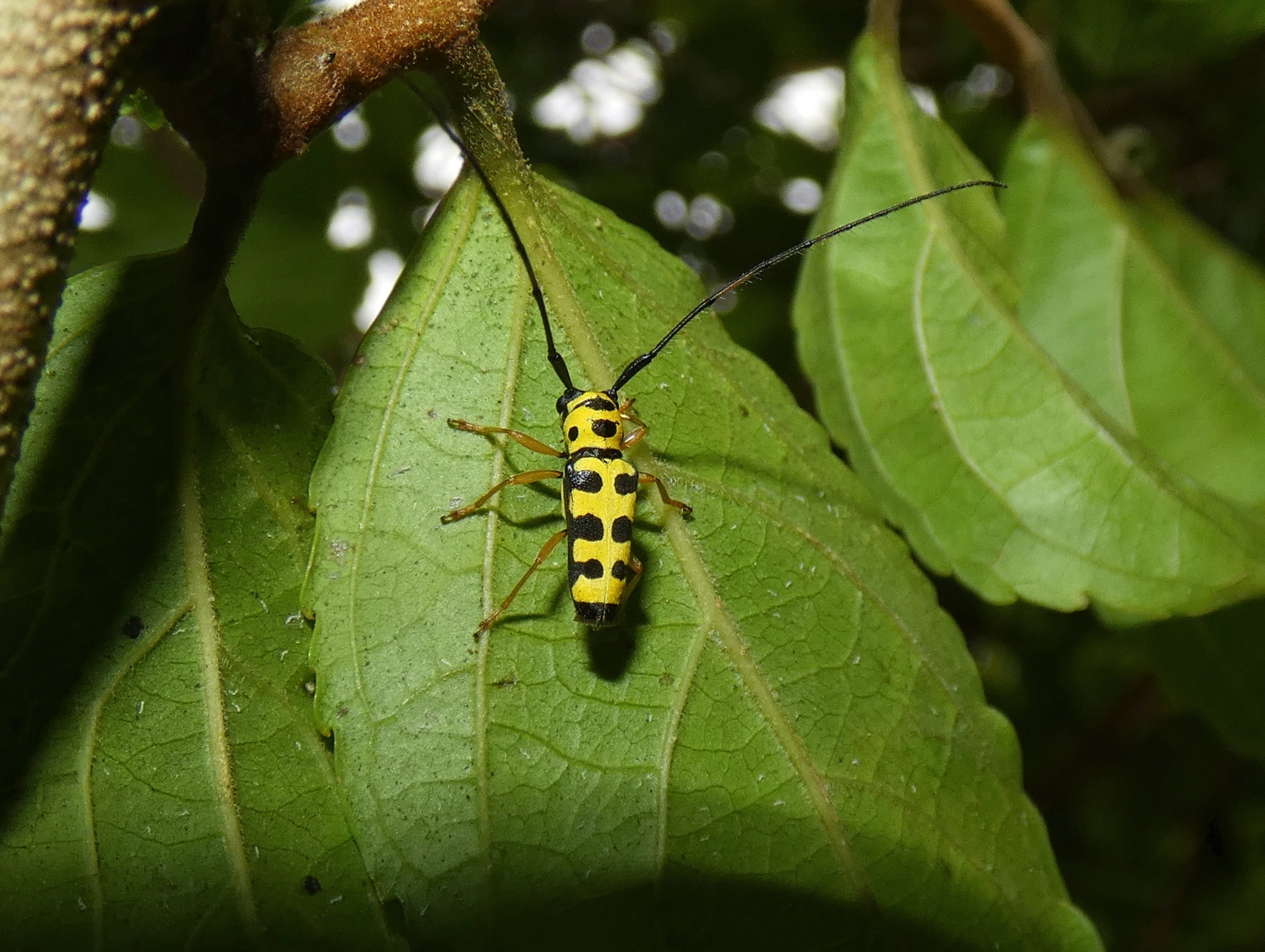
- Zeale scalaris, Panamá

Scientific classification
- Domain: Eukaryota
- Kingdom: Animalia
- Phylum: Arthropoda
- Class: Insecta
- Order: Coleoptera
- Suborder: Polyphaga
- Infraorder: Cucujiformia
- Family: Cerambycidae
- Subfamily: Lamiinae
- Tribe: Hemilophini
- Genus: Zeale
- Species: Z. scalaris

Binomial name
- Zeale scalaris Pascoe, 1866

Synonyms
- Adesmus scalaris Blackwelder, 1946; Amphionycha scalaris Bates, 1881

= Zeale scalaris =

Species of beetle

Zeale scalaris is a species of beetle in the family Cerambycidae. It was described by Francis Polkinghorne Pascoe in 1866. It is known from Colombia, Ecuador, Panama and Peru.
