= Dicentrines debilis =

Scientific classification
- Kingdom: Animalia
- Phylum: Arthropoda
- Class: Insecta
- Order: Coleoptera
- Suborder: Polyphaga
- Infraorder: Scarabaeiformia
- Family: Scarabaeidae
- Genus: Dicentrines
- Species: D. debilis

Binomial name
- Dicentrines debilis (Burmeister, 1844)

Synonyms
- Hoplia debilis Burmeister, 1844

Species of beetle

Dicentrines debilis is a species of beetle of the family Scarabaeidae. It is found in Madagascar.

== Description ==
Adults reach a length of about 3.5–4.5 mm (0.14–0.18 in). They have an elongated, rather narrow body. The upper surface is reddish-brown with darker areas on the elytra and with regularly distributed scaly hairs.
