= Sabatinelloplia ovata =

Scientific classification
- Kingdom: Animalia
- Phylum: Arthropoda
- Class: Insecta
- Order: Coleoptera
- Suborder: Polyphaga
- Infraorder: Scarabaeiformia
- Family: Scarabaeidae
- Genus: Sabatinelloplia
- Species: S. ovata

Binomial name
- Sabatinelloplia ovata Lacroix, 1998

Species of beetle

Sabatinelloplia ovata is a species of beetle of the family Scarabaeidae. It is found in Madagascar.

== Description ==
Adults reach a length of about 5.5 mm (0.22 in). They have a short, oval, rather massive body. The upper surface is blackish-brown with fine, dense yellowish scaling.
