= Hedypathes monachus =

Scientific classification
- Kingdom: Animalia
- Phylum: Arthropoda
- Class: Insecta
- Order: Coleoptera
- Suborder: Polyphaga
- Infraorder: Cucujiformia
- Family: Cerambycidae
- Genus: Hedypathes
- Species: H. monachus

Binomial name
- Hedypathes monachus (Erichson in Schomburg, 1848)

Species of beetle

Hedypathes monachus is a species of beetle in the family Cerambycidae. It was described by Wilhelm Ferdinand Erichson in 1848.
