= Amorphochelus minutulus =

Scientific classification
- Kingdom: Animalia
- Phylum: Arthropoda
- Class: Insecta
- Order: Coleoptera
- Suborder: Polyphaga
- Infraorder: Scarabaeiformia
- Family: Scarabaeidae
- Genus: Amorphochelus
- Species: A. minutulus

Binomial name
- Amorphochelus minutulus Lacroix, 1997

Species of beetle

Amorphochelus minutulus is a species of beetle of the family Scarabaeidae. It is found in Madagascar.

== Description ==
Adults reach a length of about 5–5.5 mm (0.20–0.22 in). They have an elongated body. The upper surface is dark brown with dense, fine, elongated hairs.
