= Amorphochelus minutus =

Scientific classification
- Kingdom: Animalia
- Phylum: Arthropoda
- Clade: Pancrustacea
- Class: Insecta
- Order: Coleoptera
- Suborder: Polyphaga
- Infraorder: Scarabaeiformia
- Family: Scarabaeidae
- Genus: Amorphochelus
- Species: A. minutus

Binomial name
- Amorphochelus minutus Lacroix, 1997

Species of beetle

Amorphochelus minutus is a species of beetle (Coleoptera) of the family Scarabaeidae. It is found in Madagascar.

== Description ==
Adults reach a length of about 4.5–5 mm (0.18–0.20 in). They have an elongated body. The upper surface is dark brown or black with fine, sparse, scattered hairs.
