= Dicentrines =

Scientific classification
- Kingdom: Animalia
- Phylum: Arthropoda
- Class: Insecta
- Order: Coleoptera
- Suborder: Polyphaga
- Infraorder: Scarabaeiformia
- Family: Scarabaeidae
- Subfamily: Melolonthinae
- Tribe: Hopliini
- Genus: Dicentrines; Burmeister, 1844

Genus of leaf beetles

Dicentrines is a genus of beetles belonging to the family Scarabaeidae.

== Species ==
- Dicentrines adspersus (Klug, 1834)
- Dicentrines debilis (Burmeister, 1844)
- Dicentrines limbatus Lacroix, 1997
- Dicentrines lineaticollis Burmeister, 1844
- Dicentrines lineatus Blanchard, 1850
- Dicentrines pallidulus Burmeister, 1844
- Dicentrines patagiatus Lacroix, 1997
- Dicentrines pumilissimus Lacroix, 1997
- Dicentrines pumilus (Klug, 1834)
- Dicentrines recavus Lacroix, 1997
- Dicentrines sabatinellii Lacroix, 1997
- Dicentrines tesserulus Fairmaire, 1897
