= Subrinus =

Scientific classification
- Kingdom: Animalia
- Phylum: Arthropoda
- Clade: Pancrustacea
- Class: Insecta
- Order: Coleoptera
- Suborder: Polyphaga
- Infraorder: Scarabaeiformia
- Family: Scarabaeidae
- Subfamily: Aphodiinae
- Tribe: Aphodiini
- Genus: Subrinus; Mulsant & Rey, 1870

Synonyms
- Aphodius (Subrinus) Mulsant & Rey, 1870

Genus of beetles

Subrinus is a genus of beetles of the family Scarabaeidae.

== Species ==
- Subrinus clermonti (Reitter, 1907)
- Subrinus scintillius (Nikritin & Kabakov, 1979)
- Subrinus sturmi (Harold, 1870)
- Subrinus subtilis (Koshantschikov, 1894)
- Subrinus vitellinus (Klug, 1830)
- Subrinus yemeniticus (Petrovitz, 1970)
