= Lebasiella =

Scientific classification
- Domain: Eukaryota
- Kingdom: Animalia
- Phylum: Arthropoda
- Class: Insecta
- Order: Coleoptera
- Suborder: Polyphaga
- Infraorder: Cucujiformia
- Family: Cleridae
- Genus: Lebasiella; Spinola, 1844

Genus of beetles

Lebasiella is a genus of checkered beetles in the family Cleridae. There are about five described species in Lebasiella.

== Species ==
These five species belong to the genus Lebasiella:

- Lebasiella discolor (Klug, 1842)
- Lebasiella marginella (Chevrolat, 1843)
- Lebasiella mesosternalis Schaeffer, 1908
- Lebasiella pallipes (Klug, 1842)
- Lebasiella unimaculata Pic, 1940
