= Amorphochelus granulosus =

Scientific classification
- Kingdom: Animalia
- Phylum: Arthropoda
- Class: Insecta
- Order: Coleoptera
- Suborder: Polyphaga
- Infraorder: Scarabaeiformia
- Family: Scarabaeidae
- Genus: Amorphochelus
- Species: A. granulosus

Binomial name
- Amorphochelus granulosus Lacroix, 1997

Species of beetle

Amorphochelus granulosus is a species of beetle of the family Scarabaeidae. It is found in Madagascar.

== Description ==
Adults reach a length of about 7–9 mm (0.28–0.35 in). They have a not very elongated body. The upper surface is dark brown with fine, abundant scaly hairs.
