= Lycidola flavofasciata =

Scientific classification
- Domain: Eukaryota
- Kingdom: Animalia
- Phylum: Arthropoda
- Class: Insecta
- Order: Coleoptera
- Suborder: Polyphaga
- Infraorder: Cucujiformia
- Family: Cerambycidae
- Tribe: Hemilophini
- Genus: Lycidola
- Species: L. flavofasciata

Binomial name
- Lycidola flavofasciata Waterhouse, 1880

Synonyms
- Hemilophus flavofasciatus Lameere, 1883; Lycidola flavofasciatum Linsley, 1961

Species of beetle

Lycidola flavofasciata is a species of beetle in the family Cerambycidae. It was described by Waterhouse in 1880. It is known from Bolivia, Ecuador and French Guiana.
