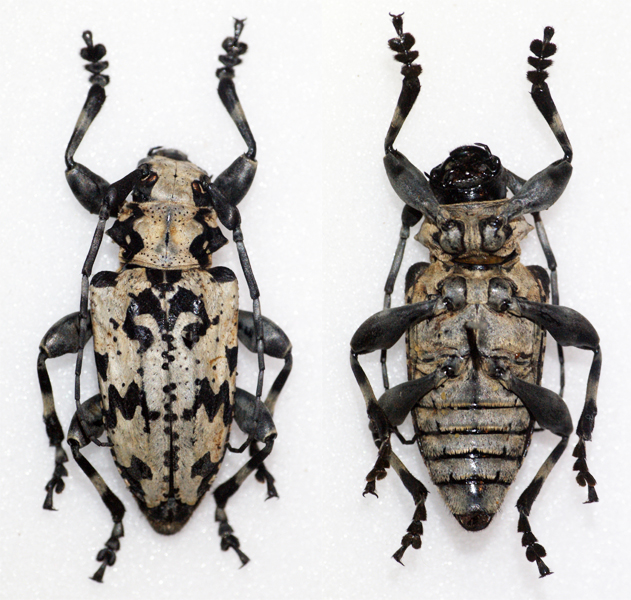
- Hedypathes betulinus

Scientific classification
- Kingdom: Animalia
- Phylum: Arthropoda
- Class: Insecta
- Order: Coleoptera
- Suborder: Polyphaga
- Infraorder: Cucujiformia
- Family: Cerambycidae
- Tribe: Acanthoderini
- Genus: Hedypathes

= Hedypathes =

Genus of beetles

Hedypathes is a genus of beetles in the family Cerambycidae, containing the following species:

- Hedypathes betulinus (Klug, 1825)
- Hedypathes curvatocostatus Aurivillius, 1923
- Hedypathes monachus (Erichson in Schomburg, 1848)
