= Lycidola popeba =

Scientific classification
- Domain: Eukaryota
- Kingdom: Animalia
- Phylum: Arthropoda
- Class: Insecta
- Order: Coleoptera
- Suborder: Polyphaga
- Infraorder: Cucujiformia
- Family: Cerambycidae
- Tribe: Hemilophini
- Genus: Lycidola
- Species: L. popeba

Binomial name
- Lycidola popeba Galileo & Martins, 2006

Species of beetle

Lycidola popeba is a species of beetle in the family Cerambycidae. It was described by Galileo and Martins in 2006.

It was discovered in Costa Rica.
