= Apeba isabellina =

Scientific classification
- Domain: Eukaryota
- Kingdom: Animalia
- Phylum: Arthropoda
- Class: Insecta
- Order: Coleoptera
- Suborder: Polyphaga
- Infraorder: Cucujiformia
- Family: Cerambycidae
- Subfamily: Lamiinae
- Tribe: Hemilophini
- Genus: Apeba
- Species: A. isabellina

Binomial name
- Apeba isabellina (Bates, 1885)

Synonyms
- Lycidola isabellina Linsley, 1961

Species of beetle

Apeba isabellina is a species of longhorned beetle in the family Cerambycidae. It was described by Bates in 1885. It is known from Panama.
