= Amorphochelus furvus =

Scientific classification
- Kingdom: Animalia
- Phylum: Arthropoda
- Class: Insecta
- Order: Coleoptera
- Suborder: Polyphaga
- Infraorder: Scarabaeiformia
- Family: Scarabaeidae
- Genus: Amorphochelus
- Species: A. furvus

Binomial name
- Amorphochelus furvus Lacroix, 1997

Species of beetle

Amorphochelus furvus is a species of beetle of the family Scarabaeidae. It is found in Madagascar.

== Description ==
Adults reach a length of about 7.5 mm (0.30 in). They have a rather elongated body. The upper surface is dark brownish-black with sparse hairs.
