= Amorphochelus sogai =

Scientific classification
- Kingdom: Animalia
- Phylum: Arthropoda
- Class: Insecta
- Order: Coleoptera
- Suborder: Polyphaga
- Infraorder: Scarabaeiformia
- Family: Scarabaeidae
- Genus: Amorphochelus
- Species: A. sogai

Binomial name
- Amorphochelus sogai Lacroix, 1997

Species of beetle

Amorphochelus sogai is a species of beetle of the family Scarabaeidae. It is found in Madagascar.

== Description ==
Adults reach a length of about 8–9 mm (0.31–0.35 in). They have an elongated body. The upper surface is dark brown with fine, sparse hairs.
