= Lycidola felix =

Scientific classification
- Domain: Eukaryota
- Kingdom: Animalia
- Phylum: Arthropoda
- Class: Insecta
- Order: Coleoptera
- Suborder: Polyphaga
- Infraorder: Cucujiformia
- Family: Cerambycidae
- Tribe: Hemilophini
- Genus: Lycidola
- Species: L. felix

Binomial name
- Lycidola felix Waterhouse, 1880

Synonyms
- Hemilophus felix Lameere, 1883

Species of beetle

Lycidola felix is a species of beetle in the family Cerambycidae. It was described by Waterhouse in 1880. It is known from Ecuador.
