= Amorphochelus limatus =

Scientific classification
- Kingdom: Animalia
- Phylum: Arthropoda
- Class: Insecta
- Order: Coleoptera
- Suborder: Polyphaga
- Infraorder: Scarabaeiformia
- Family: Scarabaeidae
- Genus: Amorphochelus
- Species: A. limatus

Binomial name
- Amorphochelus limatus Lacroix, 1997

Species of beetle

Amorphochelus limatus is a species of beetle of the family Scarabaeidae. It is found in Madagascar.

== Description ==
Adults reach a length of about 6–7 mm (0.24–0.28 in). They have an elongated body. The upper surface is reddish with fine, sparse hairs.
