= Subrinus sturmi =

Scientific classification
- Kingdom: Animalia
- Phylum: Arthropoda
- Clade: Pancrustacea
- Class: Insecta
- Order: Coleoptera
- Suborder: Polyphaga
- Infraorder: Scarabaeiformia
- Family: Scarabaeidae
- Genus: Subrinus
- Species: S. sturmi

Binomial name
- Subrinus sturmi (Harold, 1870)

Synonyms
- Aphodius sturmi Harold, 1870; Aphodius (Nialus) inouei Nomura, 1942; Aphodius illigeri Mulsant & Rey, 1870; Aphodius cyclocephalus Dejean, 1833; Aphodius vinaceus Sturm, 1826; Aphodius rufus Sturm, 1805

Species of beetle

Subrinus sturmi is a species of beetle of the family Scarabaeidae. It is found in Albania, Algeria, Armenia, Austria, Azerbaijan, Bosnia Herzegovina, Bulgaria, China (Liaoning, Nei Mongol), Croatia, the Czech Republic, Egypt, France, Georgia, Germany, Great Britain, Greece, Hungary, Iran, Israel, Italy, Japan, Kazakhstan, Korea, Libya, Malta, Macedonia, Mongolia, Montenegro, Morocco, Poland, Portugal, Romania, Russia (including the Russian Far East), Serbia, Slovakia, Spain, Switzerland, Tunisia, Turkey, Turkmenistan and Ukraine.

== Description ==
Adults reach a length of about 3–4 mm (0.12–0.16 in). They have a cylindrical, moderately convex, shiny, glabrous, ferrugineous body, with the head piceous posteriorly. The head and pronotum are piceous-reddish in some specimens.

== Life history ==
Specimens have been collected from human, cow and sheep dung.
