= Dicentrines tesserulus =

Scientific classification
- Kingdom: Animalia
- Phylum: Arthropoda
- Class: Insecta
- Order: Coleoptera
- Suborder: Polyphaga
- Infraorder: Scarabaeiformia
- Family: Scarabaeidae
- Genus: Dicentrines
- Species: D. tesserulus

Binomial name
- Dicentrines tesserulus Fairmaire, 1897

Synonyms
- Dicentrines tesserula

Species of beetle

Dicentrines tesserulus is a species of beetle of the family Scarabaeidae. It is found in Madagascar.

== Description ==
Adults reach a length of about 4–5.5 mm (0.16–0.22 in). They have a massive body. The upper surface is mottled dark brown.
