= Klugia =

Scientific classification
- Kingdom: Animalia
- Phylum: Arthropoda
- Class: Insecta
- Order: Diptera
- Family: Tachinidae
- Subfamily: Dexiinae
- Tribe: Voriini
- Genus: Klugia; Robineau-Desvoidy, 1863

Type species
- Tachina marginata Robineau-Desvoidy, 1863

Synonyms
- Ptilopareia Brauer & von Bergenstamm, 1889; Ptiloparia Bezzi, 1906

Genus of flies

Klugia is a genus of flies in the family Tachinidae.

== Species ==
- Klugia marginata (Meigen, 1824)

== Distribution ==
Belarus, Czech Republic, Hungary, Latvia, Lithuania, Poland, Romania, Slovakia, Ukraine, Denmark, Finland, Norway, Sweden, Bulgaria, Italy, Serbia, Spain, Turkey, Austria, France, Germany, Switzerland, Iran, Mongolia, Russia, Transcaucasia.
