= Aspergillus angustatus =

Scientific classification
- Kingdom: Fungi
- Division: Ascomycota
- Class: Eurotiomycetes
- Order: Eurotiales
- Family: Aspergillaceae
- Genus: Aspergillus
- Species: A. angustatus

Binomial name
- Aspergillus angustatus A.J. Chen, Frisvad & Samson (2016)

Species of fungus

Aspergillus angustatus is a species of fungus in the genus Aspergillus. It is from the Nidulantes section. The species was first described in 2016. It has been isolated from mangifera indica root in Mali.

== Growth and morphology ==
A. angustatus has been cultivated on both Czapek yeast extract agar (CYA) plates and Malt Extract Agar Oxoid® (MEAOX) plates. The growth morphology of the colonies can be seen in the pictures below.

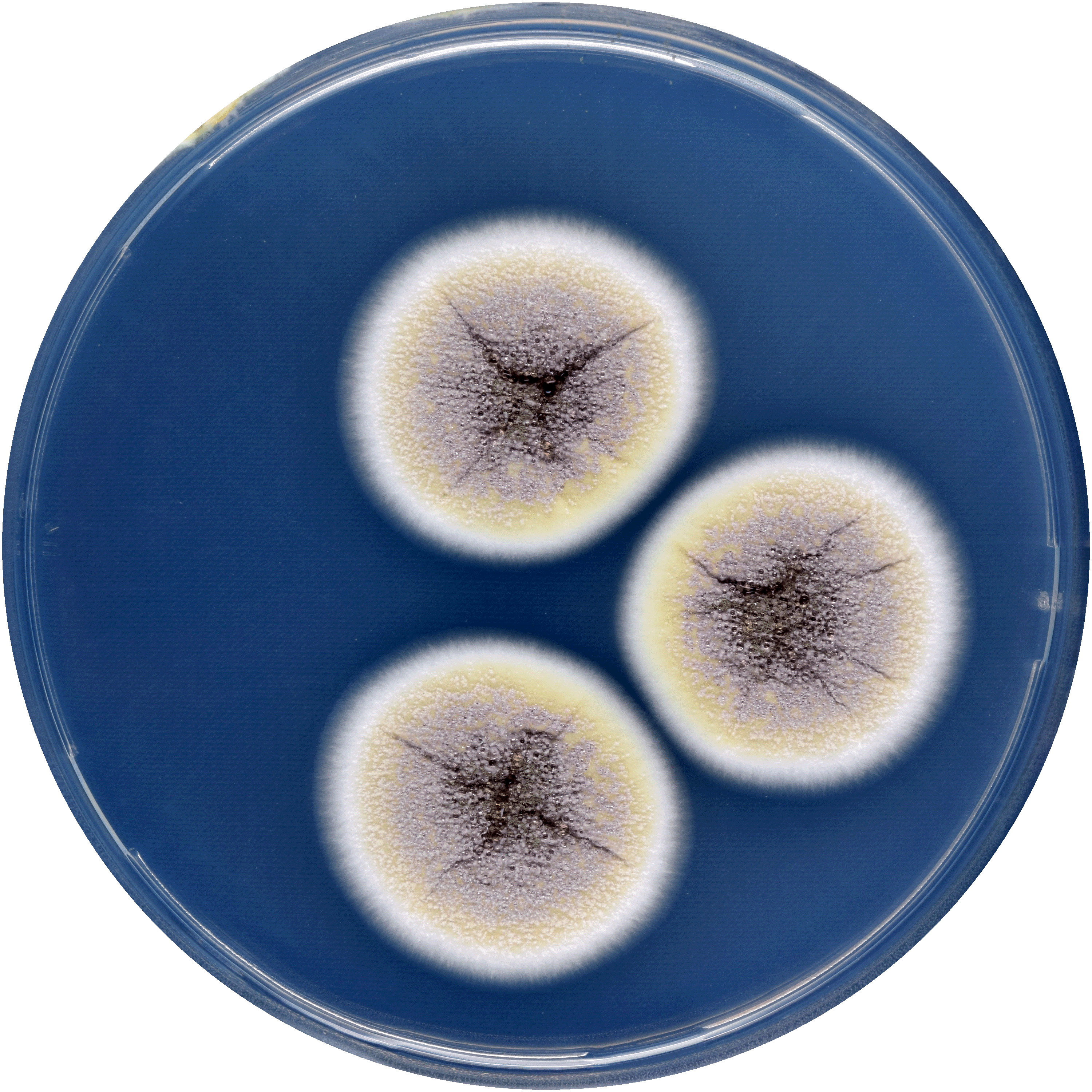
Aspergillus angustatus growing on CYA plate

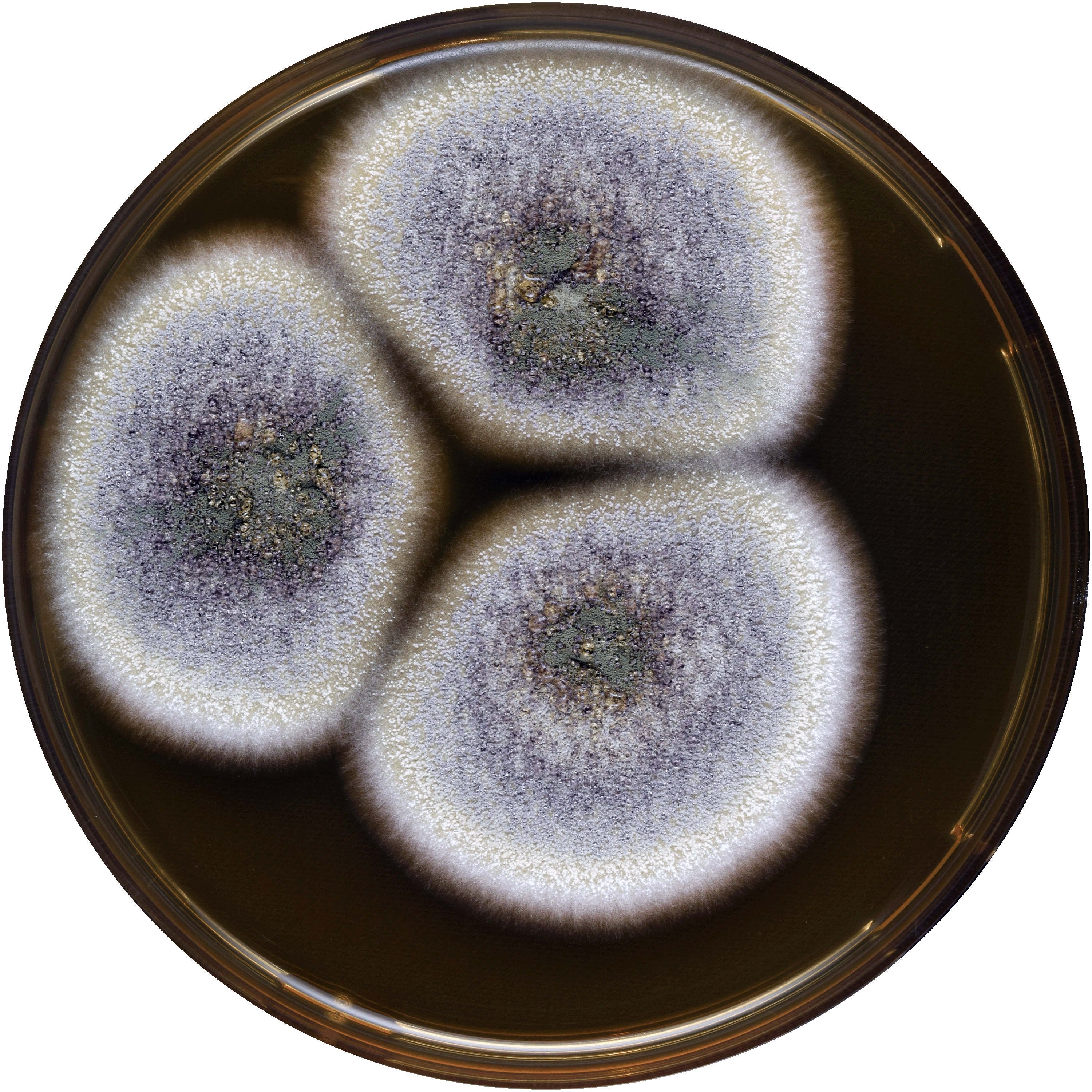
Aspergillus angustatus growing on MEAOX plate
