= Johann Christoph Friedrich Klug =

German entomologist (1775–1856)

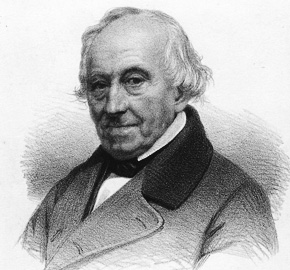
- Johann Christoph Friedrich Klug
- Born: 5 May 1775; Berlin, Kingdom of Prussia
- Died: 3 February 1856 (aged 80); Berlin, Kingdom of Prussia
- Education: University of Halle (M.D., 1797)
- Occupations: Entomologist; physician; academic
- Known for: Work on Hymenoptera and Coleoptera; curator of insect collections; director of Berlin Botanical Garden
- Honours: Genus Klugia (now Rhynchoglossum), butterflies Geitoneura klugii and Heliophisma klugii named in his honour; foreign member, Royal Swedish Academy of Sciences (1855)

Johann Christoph Friedrich Klug (5 May 1775, in Berlin – 3 February 1856, in Berlin), was a German entomologist. He described the butterflies and some other insects of Upper Egypt and Arabia in Christian Gottfried Ehrenberg and Wilhelm Friedrich Hemprich's Symbolæ Physicæ (1829 in Berlin – 1845). He was professor of medicine and entomology in the University of Berlin (known in the present day as the Humboldt University of Berlin) where he curated the insect collections from 1810 to 1856. At the same time he directed the Botanic Garden in Berlin which contains his collections. Klug worked mainly on Hymenoptera and Coleoptera. The plant genus Klugia (now called Rhynchoglossum, Family Gesneriaceae) was named in his honour as well as the butterflies Geitoneura klugii and Heliophisma klugii.

In 1855, he was elected a foreign member of the Royal Swedish Academy of Sciences.

== Works ==
(Partial List)

- Die Blattwespen nach ihren Gattungen und Arten zusammengestellt. Sitzungsberichte der Gesellschaft naturforschender Freunde zu Berlin 6: 45–62, 276–310 (1814).
- Entomologische Monographieen. Berlin. p. 172–196 (1824).
- Insecta. in: Ehrenberg, C.G. Symbolae Physicae, seu icones et descriptiones corporum naturalium novarum aut minus cognitorum (1829–1845)
- Berich über eine auf Madagascar veranstaltete Sammlung von Insecten aus der Ordnung Coleoptera. Abhandlungen der Preussische Akademie der Wissenschaften, pp. 91–223 (1833).
- Uebersicht der Tenthredinetae der Sammlung (des Berliner entomologischen Museums). Jahrbücher der Insektenkunde 1: 233–253 (1834).
- With Carl Heinrich Hopffer and illustrated by Bernhard Wienker and Neue Schmetterlinge der Insekten-Sammlung des Königl. Zoologischen Musei der Universität zu Berlin Hft. (Volume) 1 – 2 Berlin : Bei dem Herausgeber BHL (1836)
- Fortsetzung der Diagnosen der neuen (und bereits seit mehreren Monaten vollständig gedruckten) Coleopteren, welche die Insectensendungen des Herrn Dr. Peters von Mossambique enthalten hatten, von der Familie der Staphylinii an bis zu den Lamelicornia, diese mit eingeschlossen.Berichten der Akademie der Wissenschaften, Berlin 20: 643–660 (1855)
- Ueber die Geschlechtsverschiedenheit der Piezaten. Erster Haelfte der Fabriciusschen Gattungen. Mag. Ges. Naturf. Freunde Berlin 1: 68–80. (1807)
