= Leptostylus saxuosus =

Scientific classification
- Kingdom: Animalia
- Phylum: Arthropoda
- Class: Insecta
- Order: Coleoptera
- Suborder: Polyphaga
- Infraorder: Cucujiformia
- Family: Cerambycidae
- Genus: Leptostylus
- Species: L. saxuosus

Binomial name
- Leptostylus saxuosus Tippman, 1960

Species of beetle

Leptostylus saxuosus is a species of beetle in the family Cerambycidae. It was described by Tippman in 1960.
