= Pseudaethomerus maximus =

Scientific classification
- Kingdom: Animalia
- Phylum: Arthropoda
- Class: Insecta
- Order: Coleoptera
- Suborder: Polyphaga
- Infraorder: Cucujiformia
- Family: Cerambycidae
- Genus: Pseudaethomerus
- Species: P. maximus

Binomial name
- Pseudaethomerus maximus Tippmann, 1953

Species of beetle

Pseudaethomerus maximus is a species of beetle in the family Cerambycidae. It was described by Friedrich F. Tippmann in 1953.
