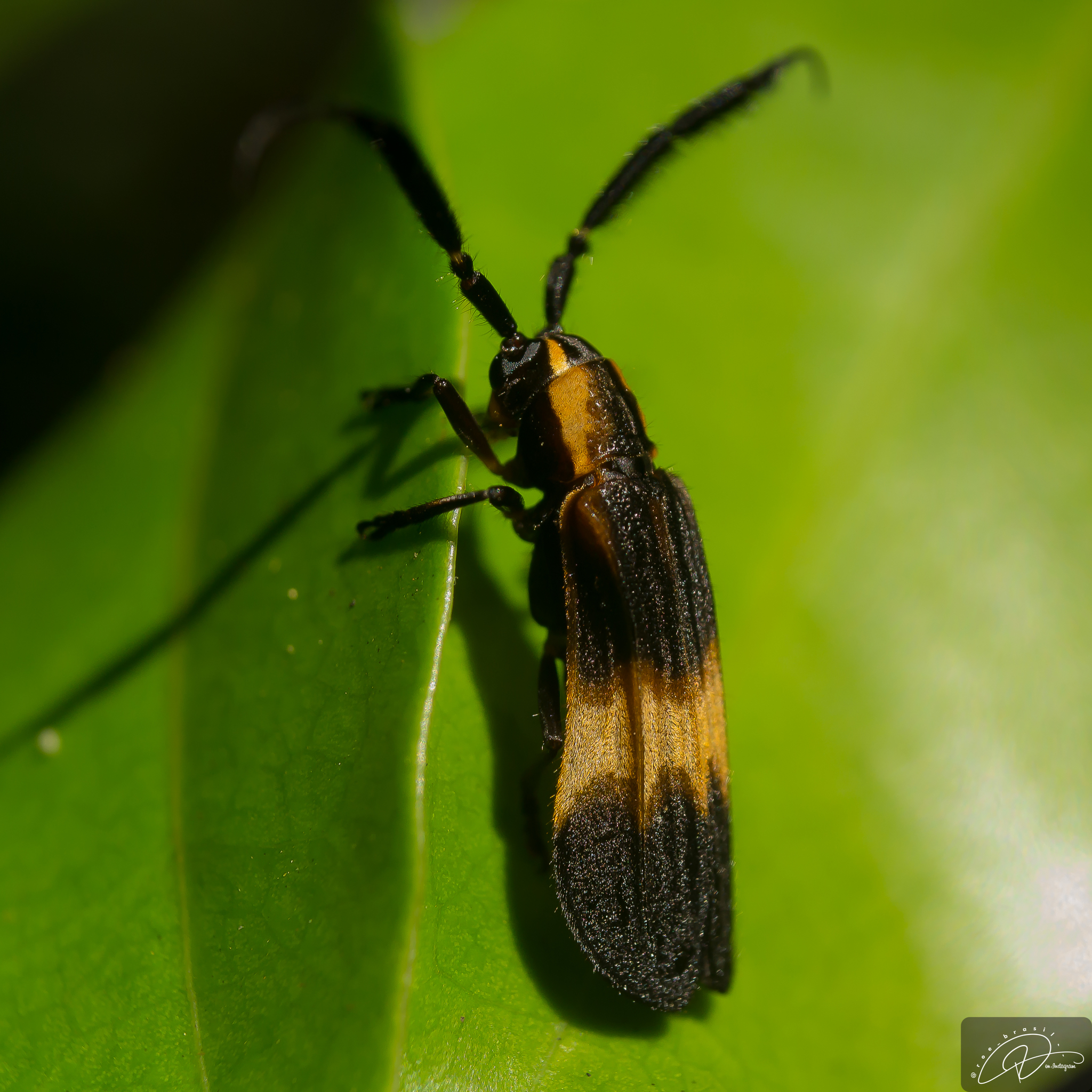

Scientific classification
- Kingdom: Animalia
- Phylum: Arthropoda
- Class: Insecta
- Order: Coleoptera
- Suborder: Polyphaga
- Infraorder: Cucujiformia
- Family: Cerambycidae
- Genus: Lycaneptia
- Species: L. nigrobasalis

Binomial name
- Lycaneptia nigrobasalis Tippmann, 1960

Synonyms
- Lycaneptia quadricostata Martins & Galileo, 1991; Lycaneptidia amicta Viana, 1972

= Lycaneptia nigrobasalis =

Species of beetle

Lycaneptia nigrobasalis is a species of beetle in the family Cerambycidae. It was described by Friedrich F. Tippmann in 1960. It is found in Brazil.
