= Leptostylus paraleucus =

Scientific classification
- Kingdom: Animalia
- Phylum: Arthropoda
- Class: Insecta
- Order: Coleoptera
- Suborder: Polyphaga
- Infraorder: Cucujiformia
- Family: Cerambycidae
- Genus: Leptostylus
- Species: L. paraleucus

Binomial name
- Leptostylus paraleucus Monné & Hoffmann, 1981

Species of beetle

Leptostylus paraleucus is a species of beetle in the family Cerambycidae. It was described by Monné & Hoffmann in 1981.
