= Leptostylus albicinctus =

Scientific classification
- Kingdom: Animalia
- Phylum: Arthropoda
- Class: Insecta
- Order: Coleoptera
- Suborder: Polyphaga
- Infraorder: Cucujiformia
- Family: Cerambycidae
- Genus: Leptostylus
- Species: L. albicinctus

Binomial name
- Leptostylus albicinctus Bates, 1885

Species of beetle

Leptostylus albicinctus is a species of longhorn beetles of the subfamily Lamiinae. It was described by Henry Walter Bates in 1885, and is known from Mexico and Costa Rica.
