= Leptostylus arciferus =

Scientific classification
- Kingdom: Animalia
- Phylum: Arthropoda
- Class: Insecta
- Order: Coleoptera
- Suborder: Polyphaga
- Infraorder: Cucujiformia
- Family: Cerambycidae
- Genus: Leptostylus
- Species: L. arciferus

Binomial name
- Leptostylus arciferus Gahan, 1892

Species of beetle

Leptostylus arciferus is a species of longhorn beetles of the subfamily Lamiinae. It was described by Gahan in 1892, and is known from Mexico.
