= Leptostylus lilliputanus =

Scientific classification
- Kingdom: Animalia
- Phylum: Arthropoda
- Class: Insecta
- Order: Coleoptera
- Suborder: Polyphaga
- Infraorder: Cucujiformia
- Family: Cerambycidae
- Genus: Leptostylus
- Species: L. lilliputanus

Binomial name
- Leptostylus lilliputanus Thomson, 1865

Species of beetle

Leptostylus lilliputanus is a species of beetle in the family Cerambycidae. It was described by Thomson in 1865.
