= Leptostylus cretatellus =

Scientific classification
- Kingdom: Animalia
- Phylum: Arthropoda
- Class: Insecta
- Order: Coleoptera
- Suborder: Polyphaga
- Infraorder: Cucujiformia
- Family: Cerambycidae
- Genus: Leptostylus
- Species: L. cretatellus

Binomial name
- Leptostylus cretatellus Bates, 1863

Species of beetle

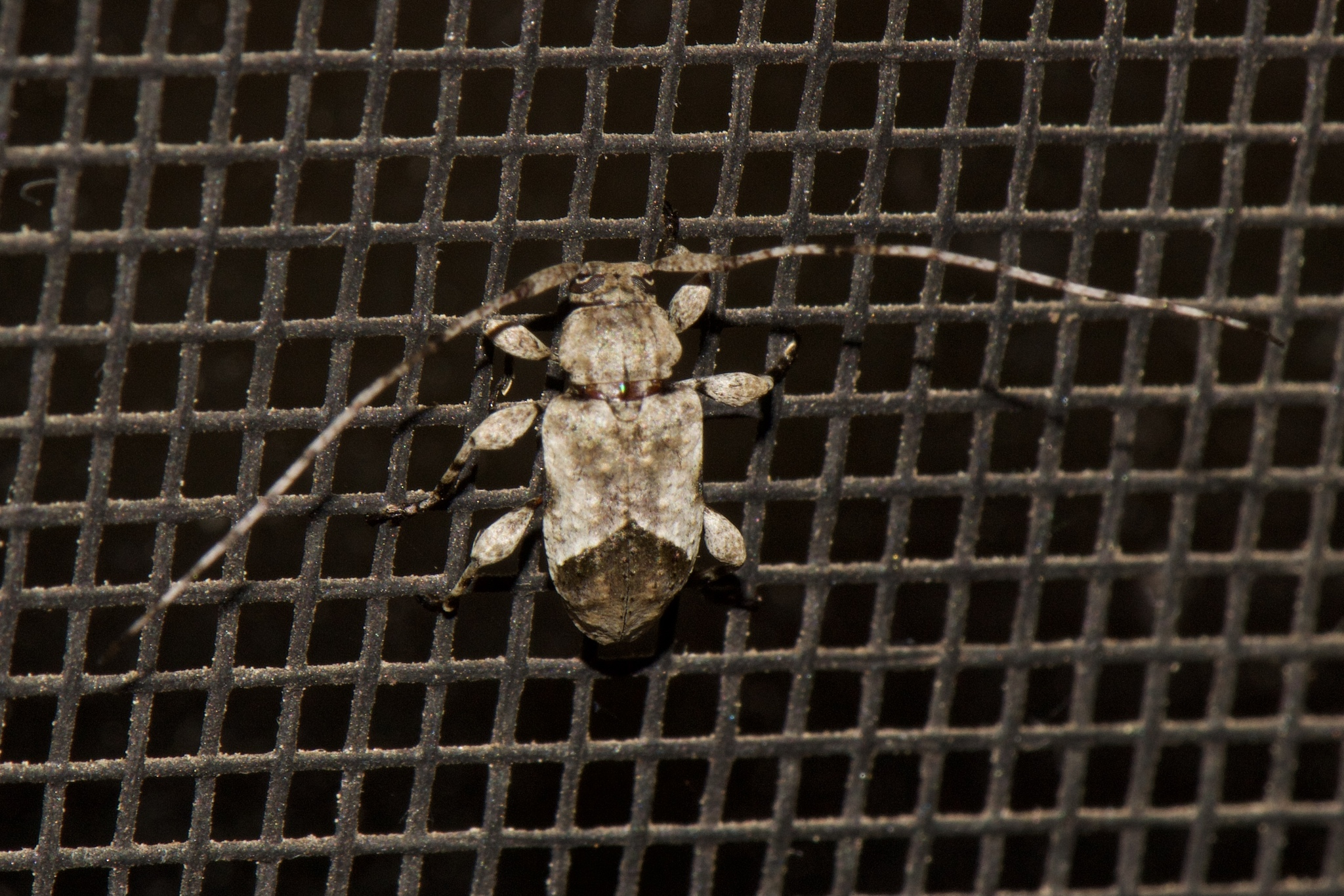
Leptostylus cretatellus in the United States.

Leptostylus cretatellus is a species of longhorn beetles of the subfamily Lamiinae. It was described by Henry Walter Bates in 1863.
