= Leptostylus armatus =

Scientific classification
- Kingdom: Animalia
- Phylum: Arthropoda
- Class: Insecta
- Order: Coleoptera
- Suborder: Polyphaga
- Infraorder: Cucujiformia
- Family: Cerambycidae
- Genus: Leptostylus
- Species: L. armatus

Binomial name
- Leptostylus armatus Monné & Hoffmann, 1981

Species of beetle

Leptostylus armatus is a species of longhorn beetles of the subfamily Lamiinae. It was described by Monné and Hoffmann in 1981, and is known from Brazil, Ecuador, Peru, and Bolivia.
