= Leptostylus spermovoratis =

Scientific classification
- Kingdom: Animalia
- Phylum: Arthropoda
- Class: Insecta
- Order: Coleoptera
- Suborder: Polyphaga
- Infraorder: Cucujiformia
- Family: Cerambycidae
- Genus: Leptostylus
- Species: L. spermovoratis

Binomial name
- Leptostylus spermovoratis Chemsack, 1972

Species of beetle

Leptostylus spermovoratis is a species of beetle in the family Cerambycidae. It was described by Chemsack in 1972.
