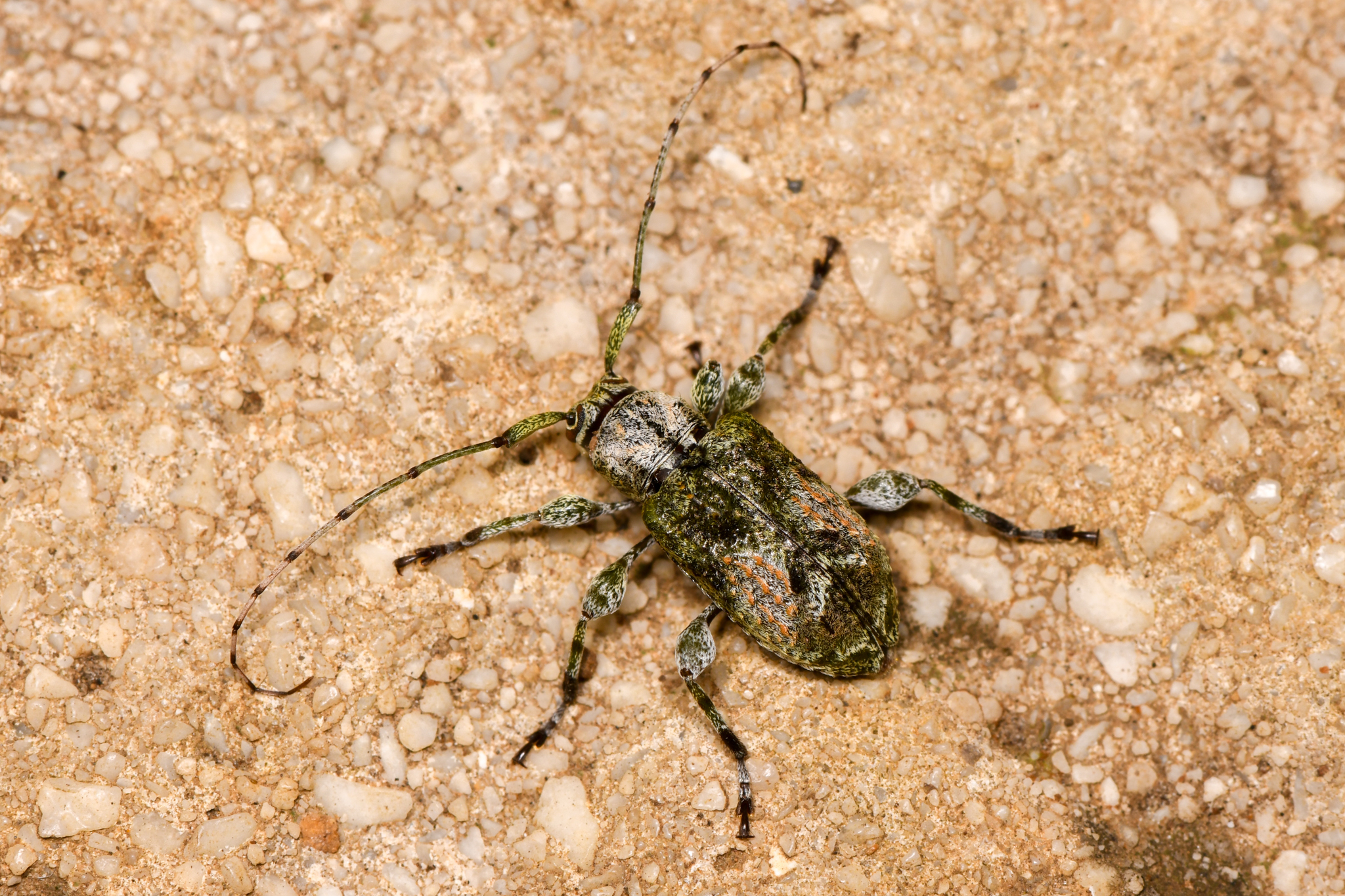

Scientific classification
- Kingdom: Animalia
- Phylum: Arthropoda
- Class: Insecta
- Order: Coleoptera
- Suborder: Polyphaga
- Infraorder: Cucujiformia
- Family: Cerambycidae
- Genus: Leptostylus
- Species: L. cineraceus

Binomial name
- Leptostylus cineraceus Bates, 1874

= Leptostylus cineraceus =

Species of beetle

Leptostylus cineraceus is a species of longhorn beetle of the subfamily Lamiinae. It was first described by Henry Walter Bates in 1874, and is known from Honduras, Guatemala, and Costa Rica.
