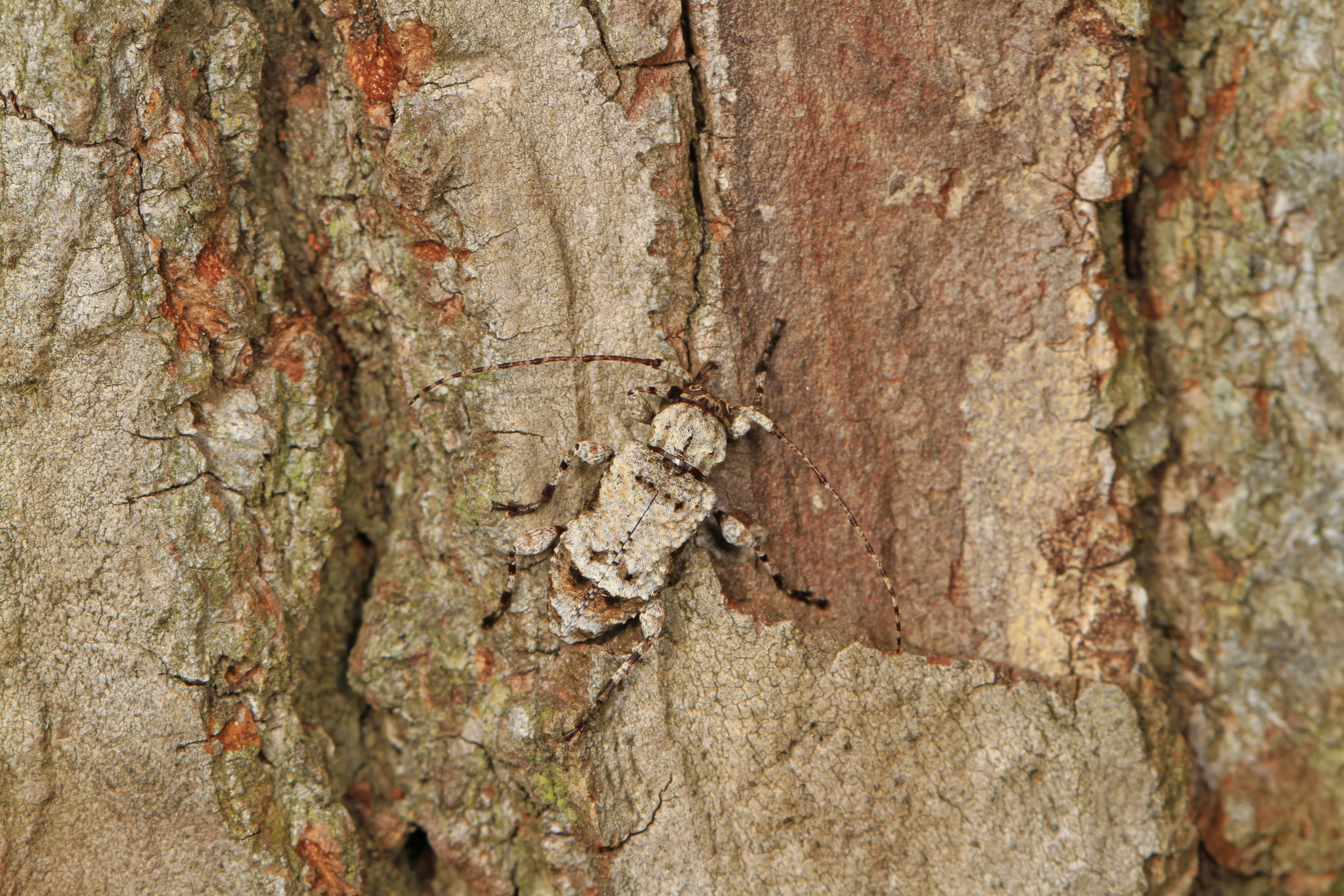

Scientific classification
- Kingdom: Animalia
- Phylum: Arthropoda
- Class: Insecta
- Order: Coleoptera
- Suborder: Polyphaga
- Infraorder: Cucujiformia
- Family: Cerambycidae
- Genus: Leptostylus
- Species: L. asperatus

Binomial name
- Leptostylus asperatus (Haldeman, 1847)

= Leptostylus asperatus =

Species of beetle

Leptostylus asperatus is a species of longhorn beetles of the subfamily Lamiinae. It was described by Haldeman in 1847.
