= Leptostylus plumeoventris =

Scientific classification
- Kingdom: Animalia
- Phylum: Arthropoda
- Class: Insecta
- Order: Coleoptera
- Suborder: Polyphaga
- Infraorder: Cucujiformia
- Family: Cerambycidae
- Genus: Leptostylus
- Species: L. plumeoventris

Binomial name
- Leptostylus plumeoventris Linsley, 1934

Species of beetle

Leptostylus plumeoventris is a species of beetle in the family Cerambycidae. It was described by Linsley in 1934.
