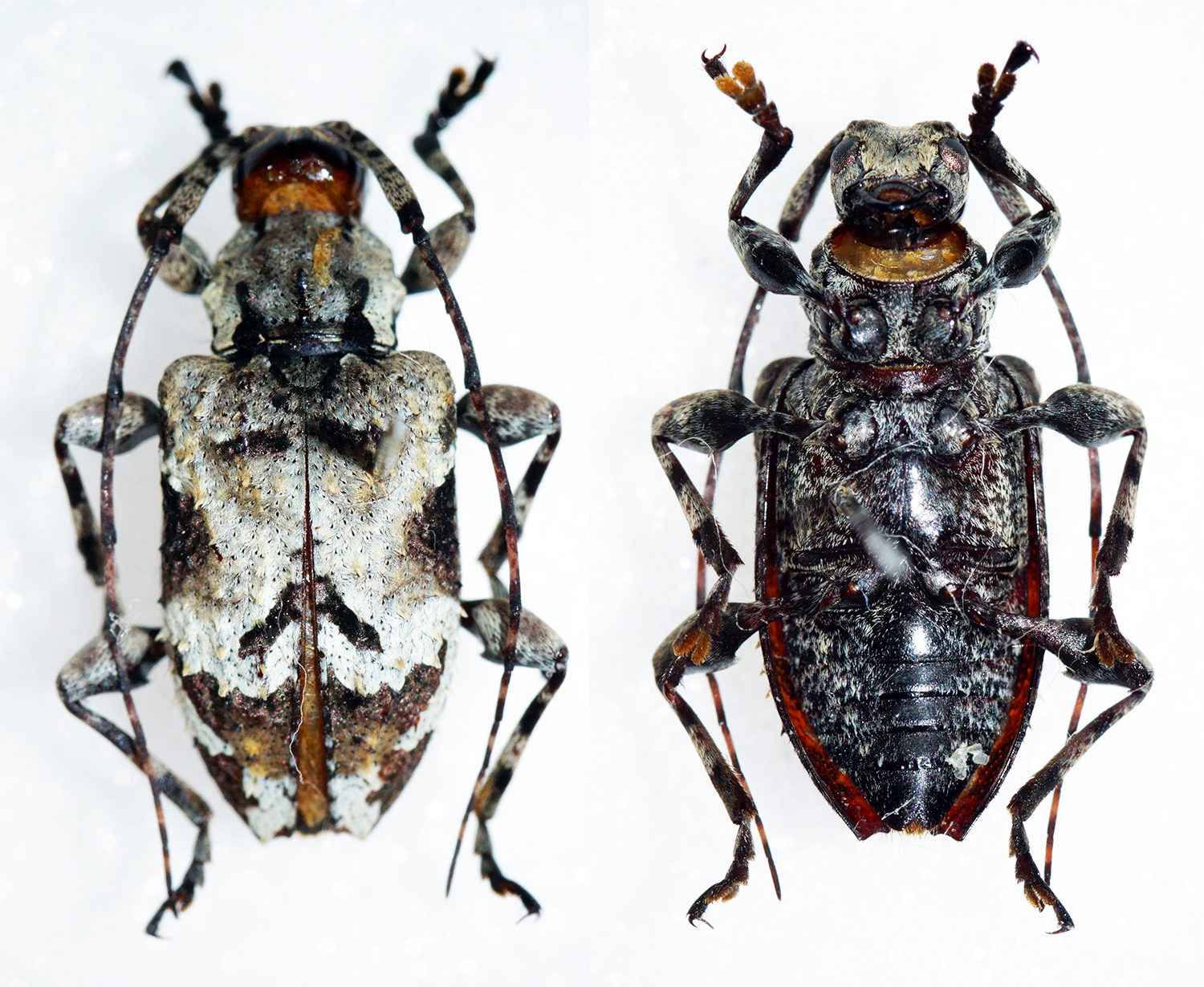

Scientific classification
- Kingdom: Animalia
- Phylum: Arthropoda
- Class: Insecta
- Order: Coleoptera
- Suborder: Polyphaga
- Infraorder: Cucujiformia
- Family: Cerambycidae
- Genus: Leptostylus
- Species: L. batesi

Binomial name
- Leptostylus batesi Casey, 1913

= Leptostylus batesi =

Species of beetle

Leptostylus batesi is a species of longhorn beetles of the subfamily Lamiinae. It was described by Casey in 1913, and is known from Panama.
