= Leptostylus hispidulus =

Scientific classification
- Kingdom: Animalia
- Phylum: Arthropoda
- Class: Insecta
- Order: Coleoptera
- Suborder: Polyphaga
- Infraorder: Cucujiformia
- Family: Cerambycidae
- Genus: Leptostylus
- Species: L. hispidulus

Binomial name
- Leptostylus hispidulus Bates, 1874

Species of beetle

Leptostylus hispidulus is a species of beetle in the family Cerambycidae. It was described by Henry Walter Bates in 1874.
