= Leptostylus sagittatus =

Scientific classification
- Kingdom: Animalia
- Phylum: Arthropoda
- Class: Insecta
- Order: Coleoptera
- Suborder: Polyphaga
- Infraorder: Cucujiformia
- Family: Cerambycidae
- Genus: Leptostylus
- Species: L. sagittatus

Binomial name
- Leptostylus sagittatus (Jacquelin du Val, 1875)

Species of beetle

Leptostylus sagittatus is a species of beetle in the family Cerambycidae. It was described by Pierre Nicolas Camille Jacquelin du Val in 1875.
