= Lycaneptia amicta =

Scientific classification
- Kingdom: Animalia
- Phylum: Arthropoda
- Class: Insecta
- Order: Coleoptera
- Suborder: Polyphaga
- Infraorder: Cucujiformia
- Family: Cerambycidae
- Genus: Lycaneptia
- Species: L. amicta

Binomial name
- Lycaneptia amicta (Klug, 1825)

Synonyms
- Hemilophus amictus Gemminger & Harold, 1873; Lycidola amicta Lacordaire, 1876; Saperda amicta Klug, 1825; Spathoptera amicta Audinet-Serville, 1835

Species of beetle

Lycaneptia amicta is a species of beetle in the family Cerambycidae. It was described by Johann Christoph Friedrich Klug in 1825. It is known from Brazil.
