= Leptostylus lividus =

Scientific classification
- Kingdom: Animalia
- Phylum: Arthropoda
- Class: Insecta
- Order: Coleoptera
- Suborder: Polyphaga
- Infraorder: Cucujiformia
- Family: Cerambycidae
- Genus: Leptostylus
- Species: L. lividus

Binomial name
- Leptostylus lividus Hovore, 1989

Species of beetle

Leptostylus lividus is a species of beetle in the family Cerambycidae. It was described by Hovore in 1989.
