= Leptostylus seabrai =

Scientific classification
- Kingdom: Animalia
- Phylum: Arthropoda
- Class: Insecta
- Order: Coleoptera
- Suborder: Polyphaga
- Infraorder: Cucujiformia
- Family: Cerambycidae
- Genus: Leptostylus
- Species: L. seabrai

Binomial name
- Leptostylus seabrai Lane, 1959

Species of beetle

Leptostylus seabrai is a species of beetle in the family Cerambycidae. It was described by Lane in 1959.
