= Leptostylus dealbatus =

Scientific classification
- Kingdom: Animalia
- Phylum: Arthropoda
- Class: Insecta
- Order: Coleoptera
- Suborder: Polyphaga
- Infraorder: Cucujiformia
- Family: Cerambycidae
- Genus: Leptostylus
- Species: L. dealbatus

Binomial name
- Leptostylus dealbatus (Jacquelin du Val in Sagra, 1857)

Species of beetle

Leptostylus dealbatus is a species of beetle in the family Cerambycidae. It was described by Jacquelin du Val in Sagra in 1857.
