= Leptostylus gibbus =

Scientific classification
- Kingdom: Animalia
- Phylum: Arthropoda
- Class: Insecta
- Order: Coleoptera
- Suborder: Polyphaga
- Infraorder: Cucujiformia
- Family: Cerambycidae
- Genus: Leptostylus
- Species: L. gibbus

Binomial name
- Leptostylus gibbus (Deeger, 1775)

Species of beetle

Leptostylus gibbus is a species of beetle in the family Cerambycidae. It was described by Deeger in 1775.
