= Leptostylus castaneovirescens =

Scientific classification
- Kingdom: Animalia
- Phylum: Arthropoda
- Clade: Pancrustacea
- Class: Insecta
- Order: Coleoptera
- Suborder: Polyphaga
- Infraorder: Cucujiformia
- Family: Cerambycidae
- Genus: Leptostylus
- Species: L. castaneovirescens

Binomial name
- Leptostylus castaneovirescens Zayas, 1975

Species of beetle

Leptostylus castaneovirescens is a species of longhorn beetle of the subfamily Lamiinae. It was described by Zayas in 1975 and is known from Cuba.
