= Pseudaethomerus =

Scientific classification
- Kingdom: Animalia
- Phylum: Arthropoda
- Class: Insecta
- Order: Coleoptera
- Suborder: Polyphaga
- Infraorder: Cucujiformia
- Family: Cerambycidae
- Tribe: Acanthoderini
- Genus: Pseudaethomerus

Genus of beetles

Pseudaethomerus is a genus of beetles in the family Cerambycidae, containing the following species:

- Pseudaethomerus lacordairei (Bates, 1862)
- Pseudaethomerus maximus Tippmann, 1953
