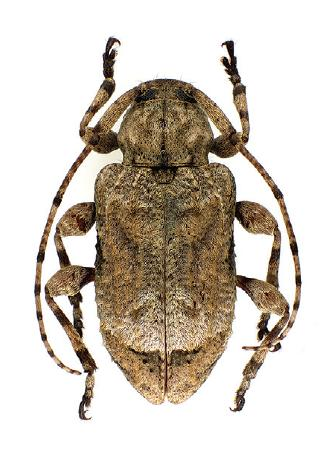

Scientific classification
- Kingdom: Animalia
- Phylum: Arthropoda
- Class: Insecta
- Order: Coleoptera
- Suborder: Polyphaga
- Infraorder: Cucujiformia
- Family: Cerambycidae
- Genus: Leptostylus
- Species: L. transversus

Binomial name
- Leptostylus transversus (Gyllenhal in Schoenherr, 1817)

= Leptostylus transversus =

Species of beetle

Leptostylus transversus is a species of longhorn beetles of the subfamily Lamiinae. It was described by Gyllenhal in 1817.

== Subspecies ==
- Leptostylus transversus transversus (Gyllenhal in Schoenherr, 1817)
- Leptostylus transversus dakotensis Dillon, 1956
- Leptostylus transversus dietrichi Dillon, 1956
- Leptostylus transversus floridellus Dillon, 1956
