= Leptostylus bruesi =

Scientific classification
- Kingdom: Animalia
- Phylum: Arthropoda
- Class: Insecta
- Order: Coleoptera
- Suborder: Polyphaga
- Infraorder: Cucujiformia
- Family: Cerambycidae
- Genus: Leptostylus
- Species: L. bruesi

Binomial name
- Leptostylus bruesi Fisher, 1942

Species of beetle

Leptostylus bruesi is a species of longhorn beetles of the subfamily Lamiinae. It was described by Fisher in 1942, and is known from Jamaica.
