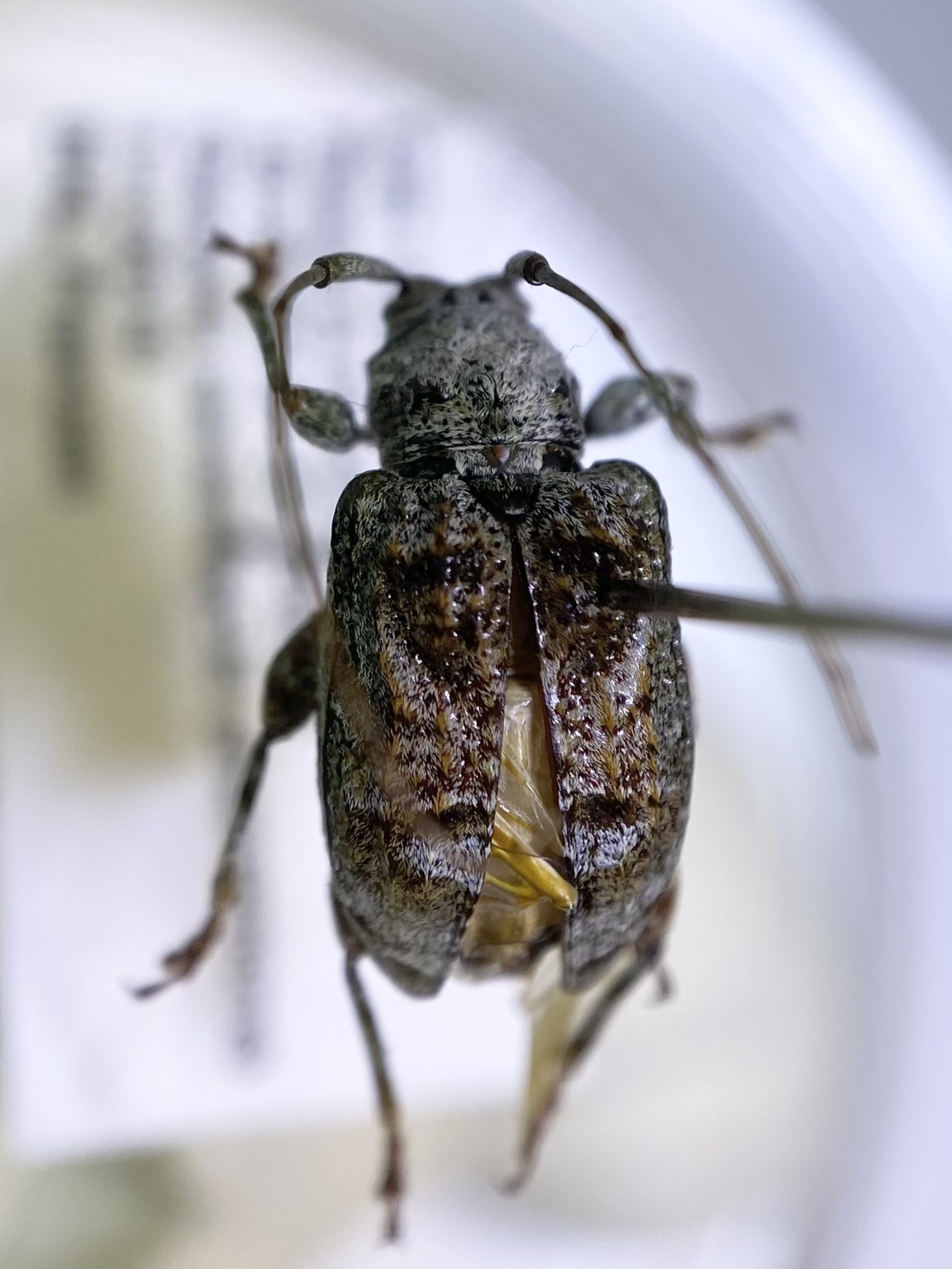

Scientific classification
- Kingdom: Animalia
- Phylum: Arthropoda
- Class: Insecta
- Order: Coleoptera
- Suborder: Polyphaga
- Infraorder: Cucujiformia
- Family: Cerambycidae
- Genus: Leptostylus
- Species: L. gibbulosus

Binomial name
- Leptostylus gibbulosus Bates, 1874

= Leptostylus gibbulosus =

Species of beetle

Leptostylus gibbulosus is a species of longhorn beetles of the subfamily Lamiinae. It was described by Henry Walter Bates in 1874.
