= Leptostylus quintalbus =

Scientific classification
- Kingdom: Animalia
- Phylum: Arthropoda
- Class: Insecta
- Order: Coleoptera
- Suborder: Polyphaga
- Infraorder: Cucujiformia
- Family: Cerambycidae
- Genus: Leptostylus
- Species: L. quintalbus

Binomial name
- Leptostylus quintalbus Bates, 1885

Species of beetle

Leptostylus quintalbus is a species of beetle in the family Cerambycidae. It was described by Bates in 1885.
