= Leptostylus viriditinctus =

Scientific classification
- Kingdom: Animalia
- Phylum: Arthropoda
- Class: Insecta
- Order: Coleoptera
- Suborder: Polyphaga
- Infraorder: Cucujiformia
- Family: Cerambycidae
- Genus: Leptostylus
- Species: L. viriditinctus

Binomial name
- Leptostylus viriditinctus Bates, 1872

Species of beetle

Leptostylus viriditinctus is a species of beetle in the family Cerambycidae. It was described by Henry Walter Bates in 1872.

This species can be found in Costa Rica, Nicaragua and Panama. There are no known subspecies.
