= Leptostylus latifasciatus =

Scientific classification
- Kingdom: Animalia
- Phylum: Arthropoda
- Class: Insecta
- Order: Coleoptera
- Suborder: Polyphaga
- Infraorder: Cucujiformia
- Family: Cerambycidae
- Genus: Leptostylus
- Species: L. latifasciatus

Binomial name
- Leptostylus latifasciatus Zayasd, 1975

Species of beetle

Leptostylus latifasciatus is a species of beetle in the family Cerambycidae. It was described by Zayasd in 1975.
