= Leptostylus corpulentus =

Scientific classification
- Kingdom: Animalia
- Phylum: Arthropoda
- Class: Insecta
- Order: Coleoptera
- Suborder: Polyphaga
- Infraorder: Cucujiformia
- Family: Cerambycidae
- Genus: Leptostylus
- Species: L. corpulentus

Binomial name
- Leptostylus corpulentus Bates, 1881

Species of beetle

Leptostylus corpulentus is a species of longhorn beetles of the subfamily Lamiinae. It was described by Henry Walter Bates in 1881, and is known from Nicaragua.
