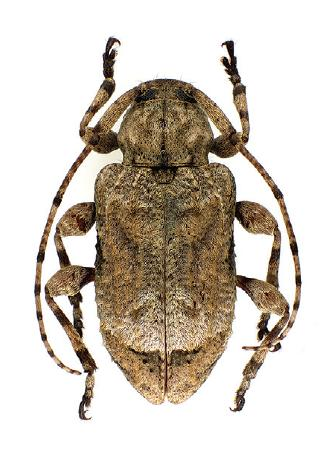
- Leptostylus transversus

Scientific classification
- Kingdom: Animalia
- Phylum: Arthropoda
- Clade: Pancrustacea
- Class: Insecta
- Order: Coleoptera
- Suborder: Polyphaga
- Infraorder: Cucujiformia
- Family: Cerambycidae
- Subfamily: Lamiinae
- Genus: Leptostylus; LeConte, 1852

= Leptostylus =

Genus of beetles

Leptostylus is a genus of longhorn beetles of the subfamily Lamiinae. It was described by John Lawrence LeConte in 1852.

== Species ==
- Leptostylus albagniri Zayas, 1975
- Leptostylus albicinctus Bates, 1885
- Leptostylus angulicollis Bates, 1885
- Leptostylus arciferus Gahan, 1892
- Leptostylus armatus Monné & Hoffmann, 1981
- Leptostylus asperatus (Haldeman, 1847)
- Leptostylus aspiciens Bates, 1885
- Leptostylus batesi Casey, 1913
- Leptostylus bruesi Fisher, 1942
- Leptostylus calcarius Chevrolat, 1862
- Leptostylus castaneovirescens Zayas, 1975
- Leptostylus cineraceus Bates, 1874
- Leptostylus corpulentus Bates, 1881
- Leptostylus cretatellus Bates, 1863
- Leptostylus cristulatus Bates, 1872
- Leptostylus dealbatus (Jacquelin du Val in Sagra, 1857)
- Leptostylus decipiens Bates, 1880
- Leptostylus diffusus Bates, 1885
- Leptostylus dubitans Bates, 1885
- Leptostylus faulkneri Hovore, 1988
- Leptostylus fernandezi Monné & Hoffmann, 1981
- Leptostylus fuligineus Bates, 1885
- Leptostylus gibbulosus Bates, 1874
- Leptostylus gibbus (Degeer, 1775)
- Leptostylus gnomus Monné & Hoffmann, 1981
- Leptostylus heticus Zayas, 1975
- Leptostylus hilaris Bates, 1872
- Leptostylus hispidulus Bates, 1874
- Leptostylus illitus Zayas, 1975
- Leptostylus incertus (Bates, 1881)
- Leptostylus jolyi Monné & Hoffmann, 1981
- Leptostylus laevicauda Bates, 1880
- Leptostylus latifasciatus Zayas, 1975
- Leptostylus lazulinus Bates, 1880
- Leptostylus leucanthes Bates, 1880
- Leptostylus leucopygus Bates, 1872
- Leptostylus lilliputanus Thomson, 1865
- Leptostylus lividus Hovore, 1989
- Leptostylus macrostigma Bates, 1872
- Leptostylus metallicus Bates, 1880
- Leptostylus neivai Melzer, 1930
- Leptostylus nigritus Zayas, 1975
- Leptostylus nordestinus Monné & Hoffmann, 1981
- Leptostylus notaticollis Bates, 1880
- Leptostylus obliquatus Bates, 1880
- Leptostylus obscurellus Bates, 1863
- Leptostylus ochropygus Bates, 1885
- Leptostylus orbiculus Bates, 1880
- Leptostylus ovalis Bates, 1863
- Leptostylus palliatus Bates, 1874
- Leptostylus paraleucus Monné & Hoffmann, 1981
- Leptostylus paulus Monné & Hoffmann, 1981
- Leptostylus perniciosus Monné & Hoffmann, 1981
- Leptostylus petulans Bates, 1885
- Leptostylus phrissominus Bates, 1885
- Leptostylus pilula Bates, 1880
- Leptostylus plautus Monné & Hoffmann, 1981
- Leptostylus pleurostictus Bates, 1863
- Leptostylus plumeoventris Linsley, 1934
- Leptostylus pseudocalcarius Zayas, 1975
- Leptostylus pulcherrimus Bates, 1880
- Leptostylus pygialis Bates, 1872
- Leptostylus quintalbus Bates, 1885
- Leptostylus retrorsus Bates, 1885
- Leptostylus sagittatus (Jacquelin du Val in Sagra, 1857)
- Leptostylus saxuosus Tippmann, 1960
- Leptostylus seabrai Lane, 1959
- Leptostylus signaticauda Bates, 1885
- Leptostylus sleeperi Hovore, 1988
- Leptostylus spermovoratis Chemsak, 1972
- Leptostylus spiculatus Bates, 1880
- Leptostylus subfurcatus Bates, 1880
- Leptostylus transversus (Gyllenhal in Schoenherr, 1817)
- Leptostylus triangulifer Bates, 1872
- Leptostylus trigonus Bates, 1880
- Leptostylus viridescens Bates, 1880
- Leptostylus viriditinctus Bates, 1872
- Leptostylus x-griseus Bates, 1885
- Leptostylus xanthopygus Bates, 1880
- Leptostylus zonatus Bates, 1885
