= Pseudaethomerus lacordairei =

Scientific classification
- Kingdom: Animalia
- Phylum: Arthropoda
- Class: Insecta
- Order: Coleoptera
- Suborder: Polyphaga
- Infraorder: Cucujiformia
- Family: Cerambycidae
- Genus: Pseudaethomerus
- Species: P. lacordairei

Binomial name
- Pseudaethomerus lacordairei (Bates, 1862)

Species of beetle

Pseudaethomerus lacordairei is a species of beetle in the family Cerambycidae. It was described by Bates in 1862.
