= Lycaneptia =

Scientific classification
- Kingdom: Animalia
- Phylum: Arthropoda
- Class: Insecta
- Order: Coleoptera
- Suborder: Polyphaga
- Infraorder: Cucujiformia
- Family: Cerambycidae
- Tribe: Hemilophini
- Genus: Lycaneptia; Thomson, 1868

Genus of beetles

Lycaneptia is a genus of longhorn beetles of the subfamily Lamiinae, containing the following species:

- Lycaneptia amicta (Klug, 1825)
- Lycaneptia nigrobasalis Tippmann, 1960
