= Leptostylus illitus =

Scientific classification
- Kingdom: Animalia
- Phylum: Arthropoda
- Class: Insecta
- Order: Coleoptera
- Suborder: Polyphaga
- Infraorder: Cucujiformia
- Family: Cerambycidae
- Genus: Leptostylus
- Species: L. illitus

Binomial name
- Leptostylus illitus Zayas, 1975

Species of beetle

Leptostylus illitus is a species of beetle in the family Cerambycidae. It was described by Zayas in 1975.
