= Leptostylus calcarius =

Scientific classification
- Kingdom: Animalia
- Phylum: Arthropoda
- Clade: Pancrustacea
- Class: Insecta
- Order: Coleoptera
- Suborder: Polyphaga
- Infraorder: Cucujiformia
- Family: Cerambycidae
- Genus: Leptostylus
- Species: L. calcarius

Binomial name
- Leptostylus calcarius Chevrolat, 1862

Species of beetle

Leptostylus calcarius is a species of longhorn beetles of the subfamily Lamiinae. It was described by Louis Alexandre Auguste Chevrolat in 1862, and is known from Cuba.
