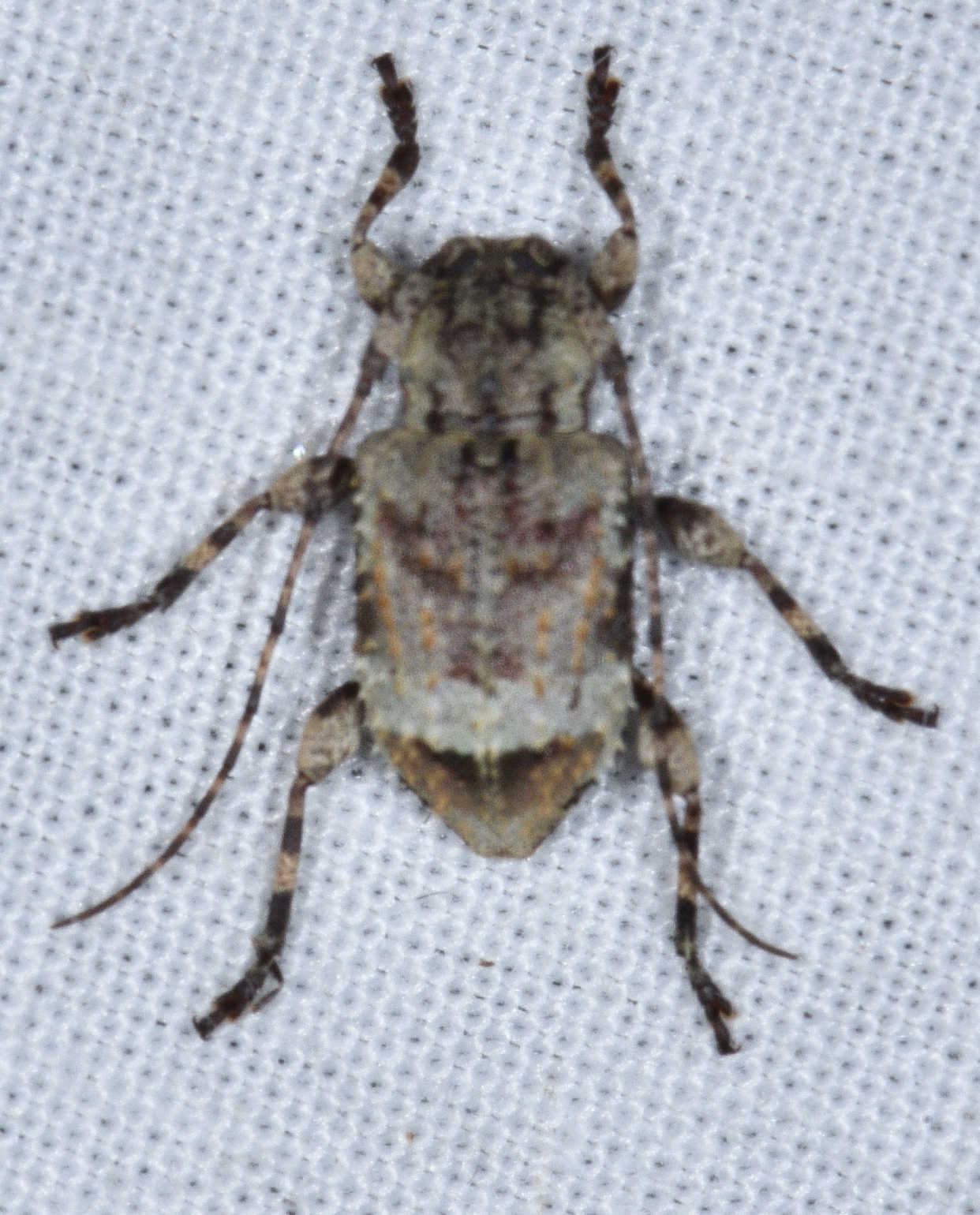

Scientific classification
- Kingdom: Animalia
- Phylum: Arthropoda
- Clade: Pancrustacea
- Class: Insecta
- Order: Coleoptera
- Suborder: Polyphaga
- Infraorder: Cucujiformia
- Family: Cerambycidae
- Genus: Leptostylus
- Species: L. viridescens

Binomial name
- Leptostylus viridescens Bates, 1880

= Leptostylus viridescens =

Species of beetle

Leptostylus viridescens is a species of beetle in the family Cerambycidae. It was described by Henry Walter Bates in 1880.
