= Leptostylus pygialis =

Scientific classification
- Kingdom: Animalia
- Phylum: Arthropoda
- Class: Insecta
- Order: Coleoptera
- Suborder: Polyphaga
- Infraorder: Cucujiformia
- Family: Cerambycidae
- Genus: Leptostylus
- Species: L. pygialis

Binomial name
- Leptostylus pygialis Bates, 1872

Species of beetle

Leptostylus pygialis is a species of beetle in the Cerambycidae, or longhorn beetle, family. It was described by Henry Walter Bates in 1872.
