= Friedrich F. Tippmann =

Hungarian entomologist (1894–1974)

Friedrich F. Tippmann (5 October 1894 — 5 August 1974) was a Hungarian entomologist who specialised in Coleoptera, especially the Cerambycidae.

== Life and work ==
Tippmann was born on 5 October 1894 in Futak, Kingdom of Hungary (now Futog, part of Novi Sad, Serbia), to Norbert Tippmann, a forester working for Duke Chotek and Martha Köllner Tippmann. His interest in science came from his high school studies in Nagyvárad (now Oradea, Romania). He later studied engineering at the Technische Universität Darmstadt and graduated going on to work in the cement and magnesium industry. During the first World War he worked as a pilot.

Tippmann married a Slovak teacher Elisabeth Csillik and learnt many languages during his travels in including German, Hungarian, Serbo-Croatian, English, French, and had a working knowledge of Latin.

Tippmann died on 5 August 1974 in Vienna.

== Entomology ==
Entomology became an interest after he first started collecting insects in Futak. He built up a vast collection of specimens and books and while he described numerous species, many of the species he collected were undescribed. Towards the end of his life he had six cabinets with sixty drawers reaching from floor to ceiling and his library of 7000 books occupied a separate room. His collection included more than 100,000 Longhorn beetles of nearly 3000 genera and 1500 species from around the world. This was the largest specialized collection of the group that ever existed. The collection was sold to the Smithsonian and his rare books were sold to the North Carolina State University. The books included some of the rarest entomological works in the world, including Ulisse Aldrovandi's De animalibvs insectis libri septem cvm singvlorvm iconibvs ad viuum expressis (1602) and Charles De Geer's Mémoires pour servir à l'histoire des insectes (1752–1778). A genus Tippmannia in the tribe Hesperophanini has been named after him by Monne.

=== Works ===
Between 1894 and 1974 Tippman compiled a work on the Cerambycidae by 9 authors.

- Sammelband von 29 Arbeiten uber Cerambyciden von 9 Autoren.
- 1960 Studien über neotropische Longicornier III (Coleoptera, Cerambycidae).
- 1960. Studien uber Neotropische Longicornie II. Koleopt. Rund.,37/38:82-217.
- 1955: Trichoferus pallidus Olivier. Mein schönstes entomologisches Erlebnis auf Wiener Boden und im Fruska-Góra-Gebirge (Syrmien). 38 pp. Koleopterologische Rundschau, 37-38: 82-217 (describes the genus Weyrauchia)
- 1954: Baumriesen und Bockkäferriesen der neotropischen Urwälder. 11 pp.
- 1953. Studien uber neotropische Longicornier - I (Coleoptera: Cerambycidae). Dusenia, 4:181-228, plos. 13–17.
- 1953. Studien uber neotropische Longicornier - II. Dusenia, 4(5,6):313-363.
- 1952: Eine Harlekinade am rio Tulumayo. 13 pp.
- 1952: Studien über Plagionotus detritus L. und arcuatus L. (Coleoptera: Cerambycidae, Subfam. Cerambycinae, Tribus: Clytini). 23 pp.
- 1946: Popis nového druhu tesaříka, Evodinus breiti n. sp., z pohoří Sajanu v Sibiři (Col., Ceramb.). 3 pp.
- 1939: Eine neue Cyclopeplus-art aus Peru (Coleoptera, Cerambycidae, Lamiinae).

== Sources ==
- Zeitschrift der Arbeitsgemeinschaft Österreichischer Entomologen, v.30 (1978–79) 137–140.
