= A. hiekei =

A. hiekei may refer to:

- Abacetus hiekei, a ground beetle
- Adesmus hiekei, a synonym of Fredlanea hiekei, a longhorn beetle found in Ecuador and Colombia
- Anisopodus hiekei, a longhorn beetle
