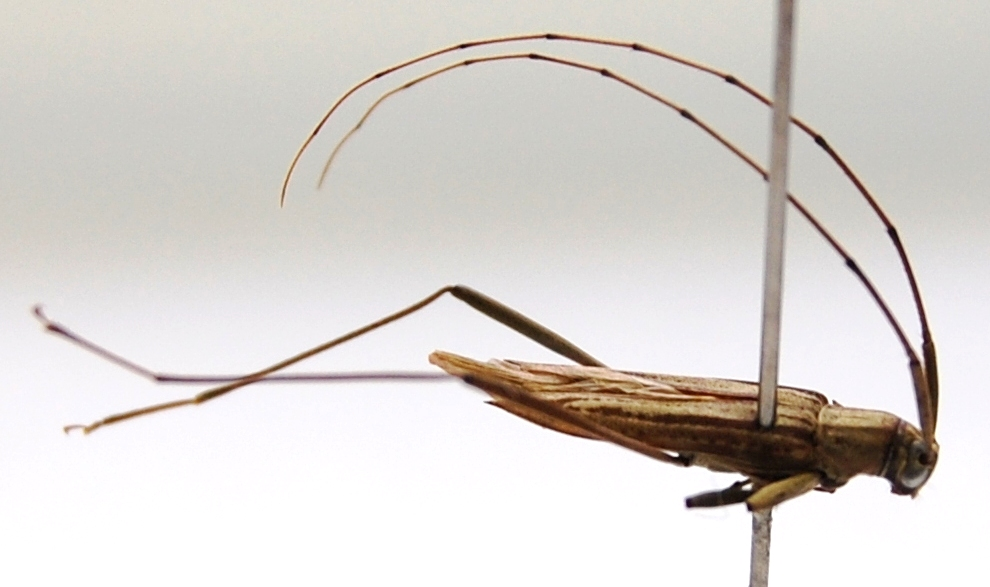
- Anisopodus strigosus

Scientific classification
- Kingdom: Animalia
- Phylum: Arthropoda
- Class: Insecta
- Order: Coleoptera
- Suborder: Polyphaga
- Infraorder: Cucujiformia
- Family: Cerambycidae
- Tribe: Acanthocinini
- Genus: Anisopodus

= Anisopodus =

Genus of beetles

Anisopodus is a genus of beetles in the family Cerambycidae, containing the following species:

- Anisopodus acutus Thomson, 1865
- Anisopodus affinis Martins, 1974
- Anisopodus andicola Kirsch, 1889
- Anisopodus arachnoides (Audinet-Serville, 1835)
- Anisopodus batesi Gilmour, 1965
- Anisopodus bellus Martins & Monné, 1974
- Anisopodus brevis Gahan, 1892
- Anisopodus callistus Bates, 1881
- Anisopodus cognatus Bates, 1863
- Anisopodus consimilis Aurivillius, 1922
- Anisopodus conspersus Aurivillius, 1922
- Anisopodus costaricensis Lara & Shenefelt, 1964
- Anisopodus curvilineatus White, 1855
- Anisopodus curvipes Martins, 1974
- Anisopodus degener Bates, 1885
- Anisopodus dispar Bates, 1885
- Anisopodus dominicensis Villiers, 1980
- Anisopodus elongatus Bates, 1863
- Anisopodus gracillimus Bates, 1863
- Anisopodus haliki Martins, 1974
- Anisopodus hamaticollis Bates, 1872
- Anisopodus hiekei Martins, 1974
- Anisopodus humeralis Bates, 1863
- Anisopodus latus Monné & Martins, 1976
- Anisopodus ligneus Bates, 1863
- Anisopodus lignicola Bates, 1863
- Anisopodus longipes Linsley & Chemsak, 1966
- Anisopodus macropus Bates, 1863
- Anisopodus melzeri Gilmour, 1965
- Anisopodus mexicanus Bates, 1881
- Anisopodus nigripes Bates, 1885
- Anisopodus phalangodes (Erichson, 1847)
- Anisopodus prolixus (Erichson, 1847)
- Anisopodus puncticollis Monné & Martins, 1976
- Anisopodus punctipennis Monné & Martins, 1976
- Anisopodus scriptipennis Bates, 1872
- Anisopodus sparsus Bates, 1863
- Anisopodus strigosus (Erichson, 1847)
- Anisopodus subarmatus Melzer, 1931
- Anisopodus varius Melzer, 1935
- Anisopodus xylinus Bates, 1881
