= Fredlanea flavipennis =

Scientific classification
- Domain: Eukaryota
- Kingdom: Animalia
- Phylum: Arthropoda
- Class: Insecta
- Order: Coleoptera
- Suborder: Polyphaga
- Infraorder: Cucujiformia
- Family: Cerambycidae
- Tribe: Hemilophini
- Genus: Fredlanea
- Species: F. flavipennis

Binomial name
- Fredlanea flavipennis (Lane, 1966)

Species of beetle

Fredlanea flavipennis is a species of beetle in the family Cerambycidae. It was described by Lane in 1966. It is known from Ecuador and Peru.
