= Anisopodus prolixus =

Scientific classification
- Kingdom: Animalia
- Phylum: Arthropoda
- Class: Insecta
- Order: Coleoptera
- Suborder: Polyphaga
- Infraorder: Cucujiformia
- Family: Cerambycidae
- Genus: Anisopodus
- Species: A. prolixus

Binomial name
- Anisopodus prolixus (Erichson, 1847)

Synonyms
- Anisopus prolixus Gemminger & Harold, 1873; Leptoscelis prolixus Erichson, 1847

Species of beetle

Anisopodus prolixus is a species of beetle in the family Cerambycidae. It was described by Wilhelm Ferdinand Erichson in 1847.
