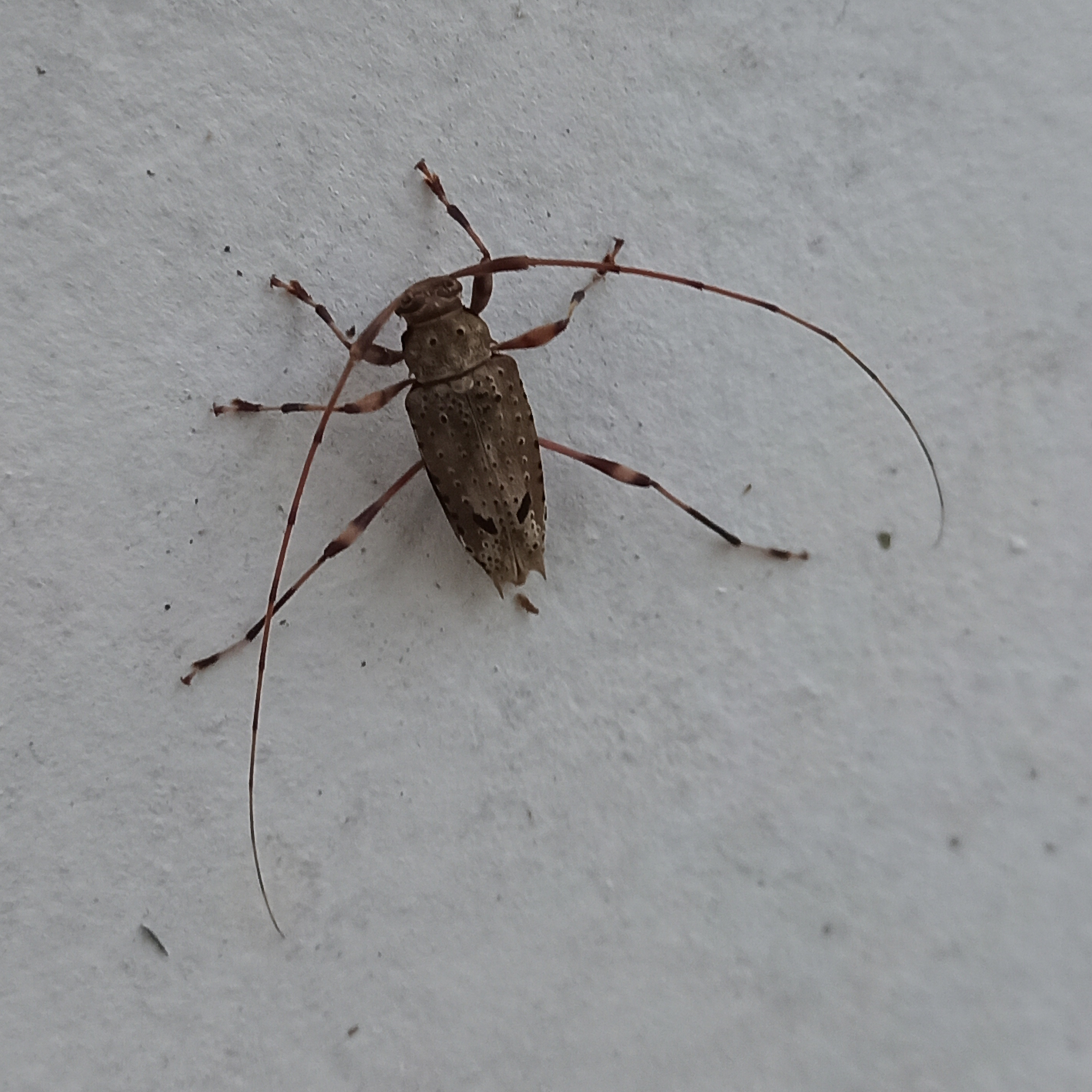

Scientific classification
- Kingdom: Animalia
- Phylum: Arthropoda
- Class: Insecta
- Order: Coleoptera
- Suborder: Polyphaga
- Infraorder: Cucujiformia
- Family: Cerambycidae
- Genus: Anisopodus
- Species: A. arachnoides

Binomial name
- Anisopodus arachnoides (Audinet-Serville, 1835)

Synonyms
- Anisopodus phalangodes Melzer, 1931; Anisopus arachnoides Audinet-Serville, 1835

= Anisopodus arachnoides =

Species of beetle

Anisopodus arachnoides is a species of beetle in the family Cerambycidae that was described by Audinet-Serville in 1835.
