= Anisopodus andicola =

Scientific classification
- Kingdom: Animalia
- Phylum: Arthropoda
- Class: Insecta
- Order: Coleoptera
- Suborder: Polyphaga
- Infraorder: Cucujiformia
- Family: Cerambycidae
- Genus: Anisopodus
- Species: A. andicola

Binomial name
- Anisopodus andicola Kirsch, 1889

Species of beetle

Anisopodus andicola is a species of beetle in the family Cerambycidae that was described by Theodor Franz Wilhelm Kirsch in 1889.
