= Anisopodus dominicensis =

Scientific classification
- Kingdom: Animalia
- Phylum: Arthropoda
- Class: Insecta
- Order: Coleoptera
- Suborder: Polyphaga
- Infraorder: Cucujiformia
- Family: Cerambycidae
- Genus: Anisopodus
- Species: A. dominicensis

Binomial name
- Anisopodus dominicensis Villiers, 1980

Species of beetle

Anisopodus dominicensis is a species of beetle in the family Cerambycidae that was described by Villiers in 1980.
