= Fredlanea virginea =

Scientific classification
- Kingdom: Animalia
- Phylum: Arthropoda
- Class: Insecta
- Order: Coleoptera
- Suborder: Polyphaga
- Infraorder: Cucujiformia
- Family: Cerambycidae
- Genus: Fredlanea
- Species: F. virginea

Binomial name
- Fredlanea virginea (Fabricius, 1801)

Species of beetle

Fredlanea virginea is a species of beetle in the family Cerambycidae. It was described by Johan Christian Fabricius in 1801. It is known from Brazil.
