= Fredlanea aequatoria =

Scientific classification
- Domain: Eukaryota
- Kingdom: Animalia
- Phylum: Arthropoda
- Class: Insecta
- Order: Coleoptera
- Suborder: Polyphaga
- Infraorder: Cucujiformia
- Family: Cerambycidae
- Tribe: Hemilophini
- Genus: Fredlanea
- Species: F. aequatoria

Binomial name
- Fredlanea aequatoria (Bates, 1881)

Species of beetle

Fredlanea aequatoria is a species of beetle in the family Cerambycidae. It was described by Bates in 1881. It is known from Ecuador.
