= Fredlanea vilhena =

Scientific classification
- Domain: Eukaryota
- Kingdom: Animalia
- Phylum: Arthropoda
- Class: Insecta
- Order: Coleoptera
- Suborder: Polyphaga
- Infraorder: Cucujiformia
- Family: Cerambycidae
- Tribe: Hemilophini
- Genus: Fredlanea
- Species: F. vilhena

Binomial name
- Fredlanea vilhena Martins & Galileo, 1997

Species of beetle

Fredlanea vilhena is a species of beetle in the family Cerambycidae. It was described by Martins and Galileo in 1997. It is known from Brazil.
