= Fredlanea velutina =

Scientific classification
- Domain: Eukaryota
- Kingdom: Animalia
- Phylum: Arthropoda
- Class: Insecta
- Order: Coleoptera
- Suborder: Polyphaga
- Infraorder: Cucujiformia
- Family: Cerambycidae
- Tribe: Hemilophini
- Genus: Fredlanea
- Species: F. velutina

Binomial name
- Fredlanea velutina (Lane, 1966)

Species of beetle

Fredlanea velutina is a species of beetle in the family Cerambycidae. It was described by Lane in 1966. It is found in Ecuador.
