= Anisopodus brevis =

Scientific classification
- Kingdom: Animalia
- Phylum: Arthropoda
- Class: Insecta
- Order: Coleoptera
- Suborder: Polyphaga
- Infraorder: Cucujiformia
- Family: Cerambycidae
- Genus: Anisopodus
- Species: A. brevis

Binomial name
- Anisopodus brevis Gahan, 1892

Species of beetle

Anisopodus brevis is a species of beetle in the family Cerambycidae that was described by Gahan in 1892.
