= Anisopodus varius =

Scientific classification
- Kingdom: Animalia
- Phylum: Arthropoda
- Class: Insecta
- Order: Coleoptera
- Suborder: Polyphaga
- Infraorder: Cucujiformia
- Family: Cerambycidae
- Genus: Anisopodus
- Species: A. varius

Binomial name
- Anisopodus varius Melzer, 1935: Nyssodrys carinata Lara & Shenefelt, 1964

Species of beetle

Anisopodus varius is a species of beetle in the family Cerambycidae that was described by Melzer in 1935.
