= Paranisopodus genieri =

Scientific classification
- Domain: Eukaryota
- Kingdom: Animalia
- Phylum: Arthropoda
- Class: Insecta
- Order: Coleoptera
- Suborder: Polyphaga
- Infraorder: Cucujiformia
- Family: Cerambycidae
- Genus: Paranisopodus
- Species: P. genieri

Binomial name
- Paranisopodus genieri Monne & Monne, 2007

Species of beetle

Paranisopodus genieri is a species of beetle in the family Cerambycidae. It was described by Monne and Monne in 2007.
