= Anisopodus affinis =

Scientific classification
- Kingdom: Animalia
- Phylum: Arthropoda
- Class: Insecta
- Order: Coleoptera
- Suborder: Polyphaga
- Infraorder: Cucujiformia
- Family: Cerambycidae
- Genus: Anisopodus
- Species: A. affinis

Binomial name
- Anisopodus affinis Martins, 1974

Species of beetle

Anisopodus affinis is a species of longhorn beetle of the subfamily Lamiinae that was described by Martins in 1974 It is known from Costa Rica, Panama, eastern Ecuador, and Bolivia.
