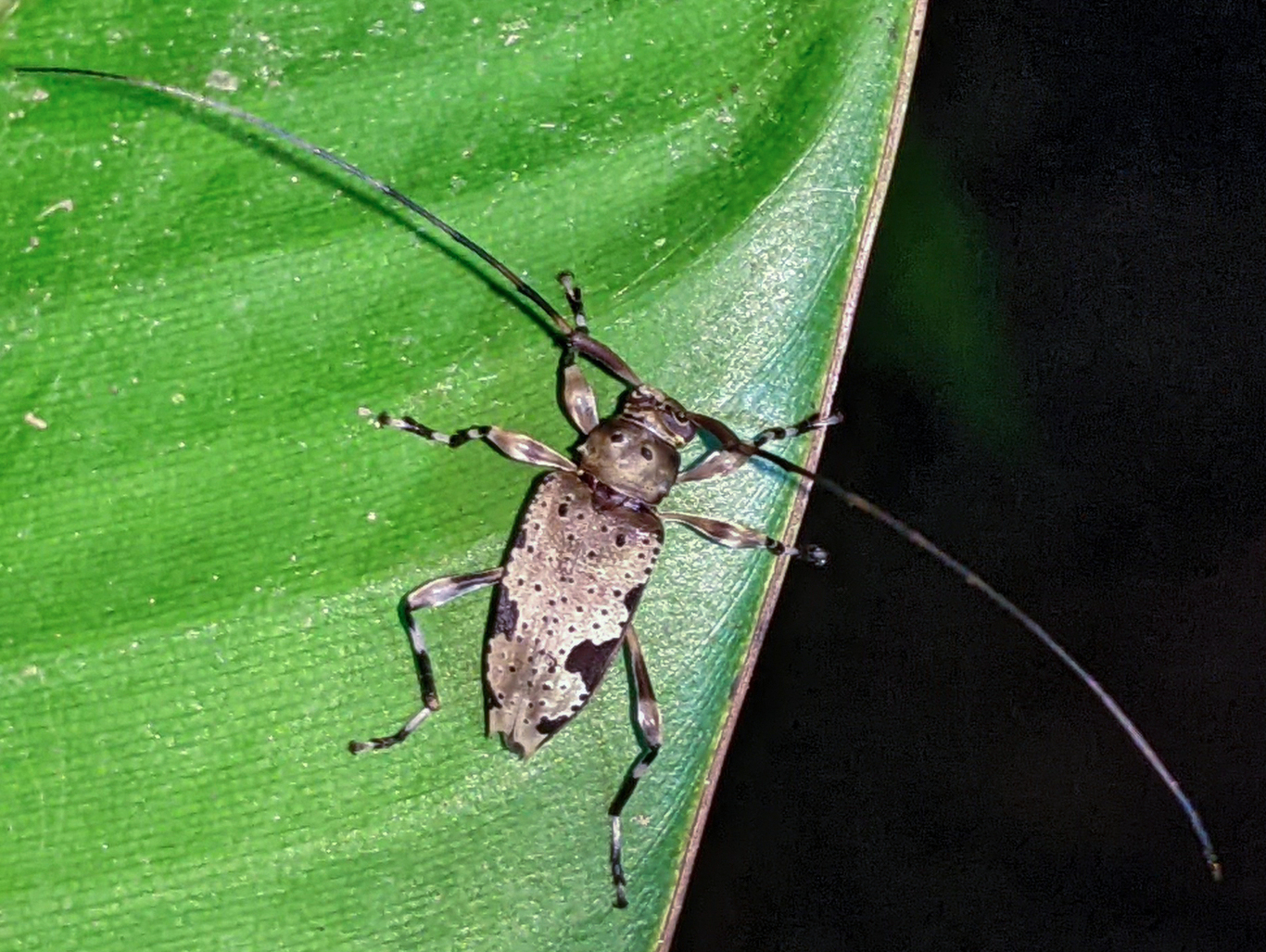

Scientific classification
- Kingdom: Animalia
- Phylum: Arthropoda
- Class: Insecta
- Order: Coleoptera
- Suborder: Polyphaga
- Infraorder: Cucujiformia
- Family: Cerambycidae
- Genus: Anisopodus
- Species: A. batesi

Binomial name
- Anisopodus batesi Gilmour, 1965

= Anisopodus batesi =

Species of beetle

Anisopodus batesi is a species of beetle in the family Cerambycidae that was described by Gilmour in 1965.
