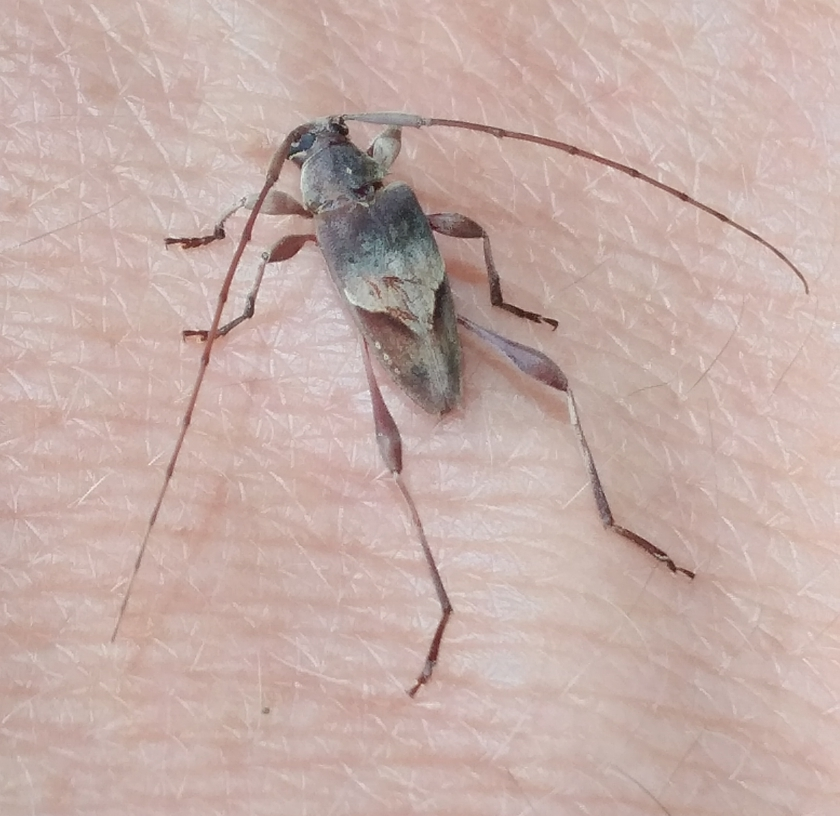

Scientific classification
- Kingdom: Animalia
- Phylum: Arthropoda
- Clade: Pancrustacea
- Class: Insecta
- Order: Coleoptera
- Suborder: Polyphaga
- Infraorder: Cucujiformia
- Family: Cerambycidae
- Genus: Anisopodus
- Species: A. curvilineatus

Binomial name
- Anisopodus curvilineatus White, 1855

Synonyms
- Anisopus curvilineatus Gemminger & Harold, 1873

= Anisopodus curvilineatus =

Species of beetle

Anisopodus curvilineatus is a species of beetle in the family Cerambycidae that was described by Adam White in 1855. The Catalogue of Life lists it as being found in Brazil and Paraguay, while GBIF lists occurences only in Brazil.
