= Anisopodus longipes =

Scientific classification
- Kingdom: Animalia
- Phylum: Arthropoda
- Class: Insecta
- Order: Coleoptera
- Suborder: Polyphaga
- Infraorder: Cucujiformia
- Family: Cerambycidae
- Genus: Anisopodus
- Species: A. longipes

Binomial name
- Anisopodus longipes Linsley & Chemsak, 1966

Species of beetle

Anisopodus longipes is a species of beetle in the family Cerambycidae that was described by Linsley & Chemsak in 1966.
