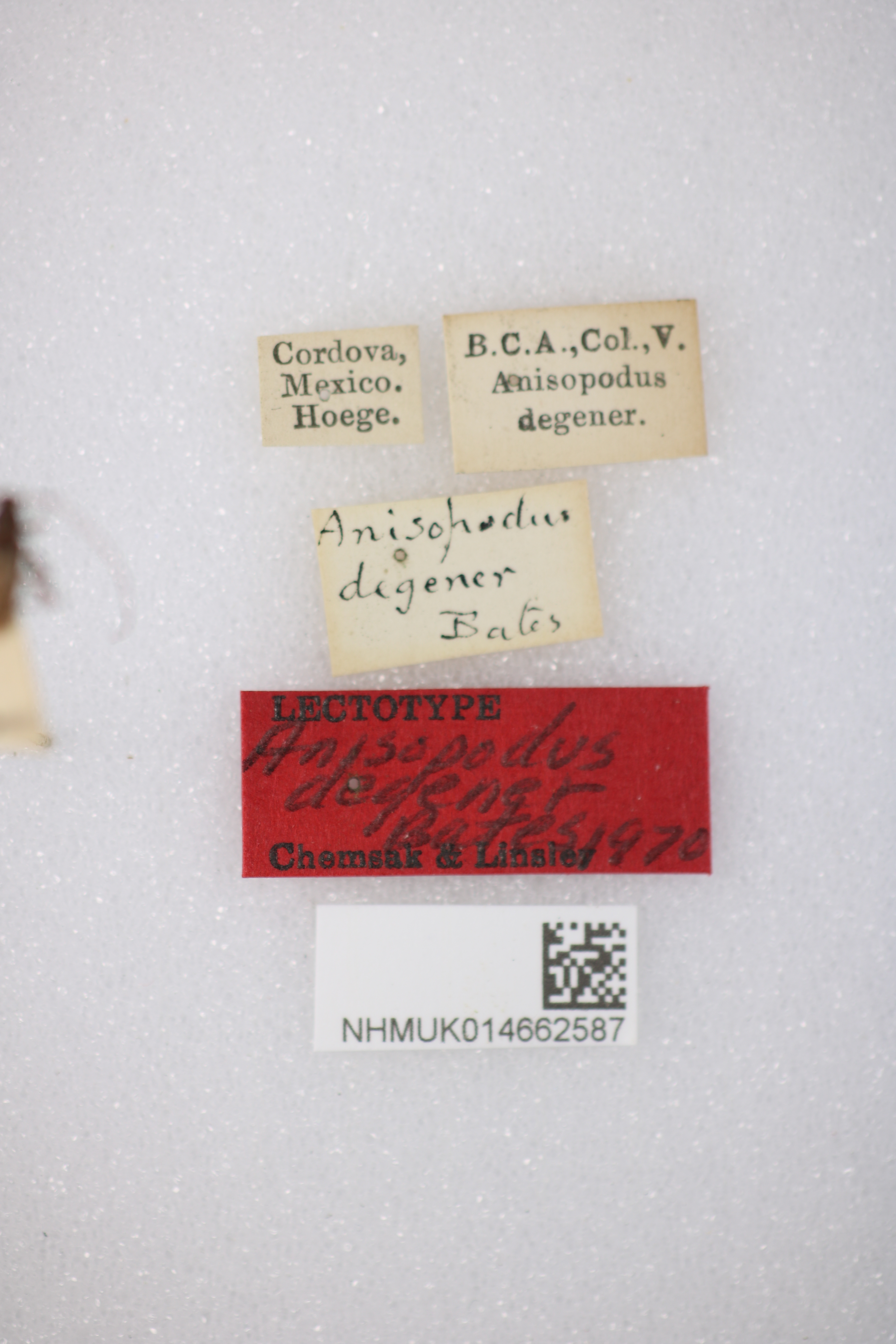
- Anisopodus degener

Scientific classification
- Kingdom: Animalia
- Phylum: Arthropoda
- Class: Insecta
- Order: Coleoptera
- Suborder: Polyphaga
- Infraorder: Cucujiformia
- Family: Cerambycidae
- Genus: Anisopodus
- Species: A. degener

Binomial name
- Anisopodus degener Bates, 1885

= Anisopodus degener =

Species of beetle

Anisopodus degener is a species of beetle in the family Cerambycidae. It was described by Henry Walter Bates in 1885.
