= Paranisopodus acutus =

Scientific classification
- Domain: Eukaryota
- Kingdom: Animalia
- Phylum: Arthropoda
- Class: Insecta
- Order: Coleoptera
- Suborder: Polyphaga
- Infraorder: Cucujiformia
- Family: Cerambycidae
- Genus: Paranisopodus
- Species: P. acutus

Binomial name
- Paranisopodus acutus (Thomson, 1865)

Synonyms
- Anisopodus acutus Thomson, 1865

Species of beetle

Paranisopodus acutus is a species of longhorn beetles of the subfamily Lamiinae. It was described by James Thomson in 1865 from Brazil. It is now also known from western Ecuador. Given that the Ecuadorian record is from west of the Andes, it is possible that the type locality of the species, Brazil, is erroneous. Moreover, some earlier records of Anisopodus hamaticollis from Ecuador and Colombia might refer to this species.

Paranisopodus acutus measure 10 mm (0.39 in).
