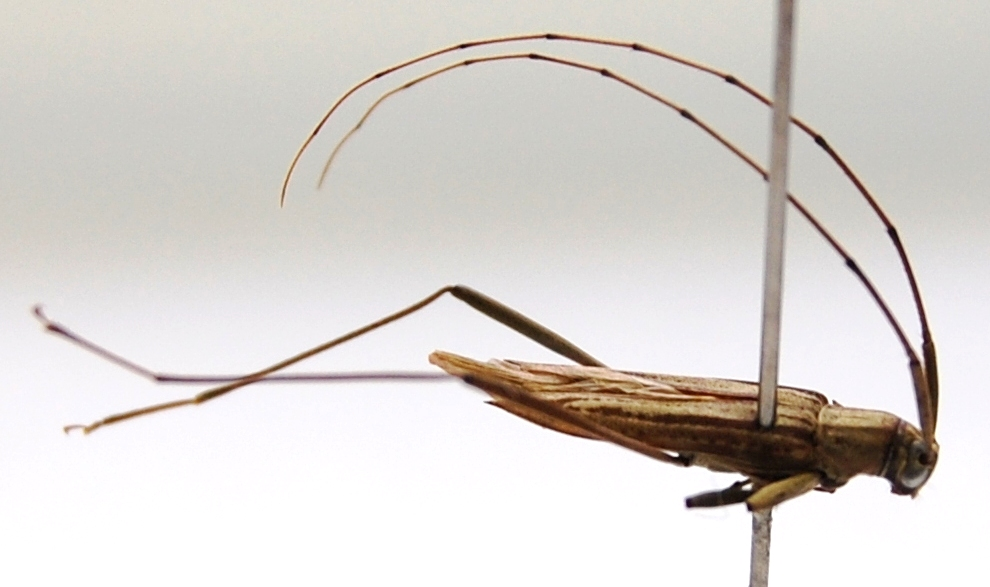

Scientific classification
- Kingdom: Animalia
- Phylum: Arthropoda
- Class: Insecta
- Order: Coleoptera
- Suborder: Polyphaga
- Infraorder: Cucujiformia
- Family: Cerambycidae
- Genus: Anisopodus
- Species: A. strigosus

Binomial name
- Anisopodus strigosus (Erichson, 1847)

Synonyms
- Anisopus strigosus Gemminger & Harold, 1873; Leptoscelis strigosus Erichson, 1847

= Anisopodus strigosus =

Species of beetle

Anisopodus strigosus is a species of beetle in the family Cerambycidae that was described by Wilhelm Ferdinand Erichson in 1847.
