= Paranisopodus granulosus =

Scientific classification
- Domain: Eukaryota
- Kingdom: Animalia
- Phylum: Arthropoda
- Class: Insecta
- Order: Coleoptera
- Suborder: Polyphaga
- Infraorder: Cucujiformia
- Family: Cerambycidae
- Genus: Paranisopodus
- Species: P. granulosus

Binomial name
- Paranisopodus granulosus Monne & Monne, 2007

Species of beetle

Paranisopodus granulosus is a species of beetle in the family Cerambycidae. It is known from Panama and Peru.

Paranisopodus granulosus measure 14–15 mm (0.55–0.59 in) in length.
