= Paranisopodus peruanus =

Scientific classification
- Kingdom: Animalia
- Phylum: Arthropoda
- Class: Insecta
- Order: Coleoptera
- Suborder: Polyphaga
- Infraorder: Cucujiformia
- Family: Cerambycidae
- Genus: Paranisopodus
- Species: P. peruanus

Binomial name
- Paranisopodus peruanus Monné & Monné, 2007

Species of beetle

Paranisopodus peruanus is a species of beetle in the family Cerambycidae. It was described by Miguel Angel Monné and Marcela Laura Monné in 2007. It is known from Peru and Ecuador.

Paranisopodus peruanus measure 11 mm (0.43 in).
