= Anisopodus bellus =

Scientific classification
- Kingdom: Animalia
- Phylum: Arthropoda
- Class: Insecta
- Order: Coleoptera
- Suborder: Polyphaga
- Infraorder: Cucujiformia
- Family: Cerambycidae
- Genus: Anisopodus
- Species: A. bellus

Binomial name
- Anisopodus bellus Martins & Monné, 1974

Species of beetle

Anisopodus bellus is a species of beetle in the family Cerambycidae that was described by Martins & Monné in 1974.
