= Paranisopodus =

Scientific classification
- Domain: Eukaryota
- Kingdom: Animalia
- Phylum: Arthropoda
- Class: Insecta
- Order: Coleoptera
- Suborder: Polyphaga
- Infraorder: Cucujiformia
- Family: Cerambycidae
- Tribe: Acanthocinini
- Genus: Paranisopodus; Monné & Martins, 1976

Genus of beetles

Paranisopodus is a genus of beetles in the family Cerambycidae. It occurs in South America and southern Central America (Costa Rica, Panama).

== Species ==
There are 11 recognized species:

- Paranisopodus acutus (Thomson, 1865)
- Paranisopodus amoenus Monné & Monné, 2017
- Paranisopodus antonkozlovi Nascimento & Santos-Silva, 2019
- Paranisopodus araguaensis Monne & Monne, 2007
- Paranisopodus genieri Monne & Monne, 2007
- Paranisopodus granulosus Monne & Monne, 2007
- Paranisopodus heterotarsus Monné & Martins, 1976
- Paranisopodus hovorei Monne & Monne, 2007
- Paranisopodus paradoxus Monné & Martins, 1976
- Paranisopodus peruanus Monne & Monne, 2007
- Paranisopodus thalassinus Santos-Silva & Devesa, 2021
