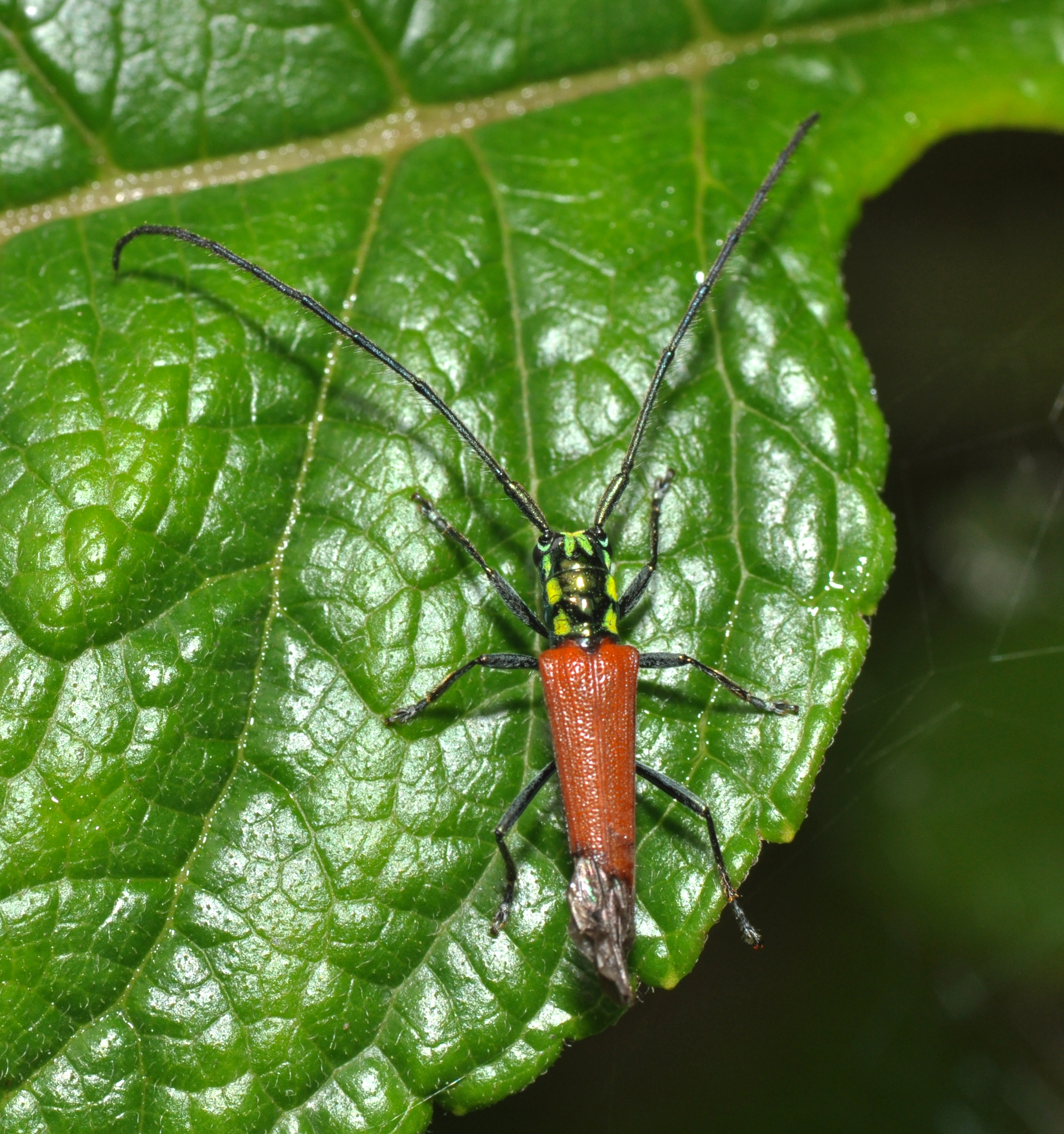

Scientific classification
- Domain: Eukaryota
- Kingdom: Animalia
- Phylum: Arthropoda
- Class: Insecta
- Order: Coleoptera
- Suborder: Polyphaga
- Infraorder: Cucujiformia
- Family: Cerambycidae
- Subfamily: Lamiinae
- Tribe: Hemilophini
- Genus: Fredlanea; Martins & Galileo, 1996

= Fredlanea =

Genus of beetles

Fredlanea is a genus of longhorn beetles of the subfamily Lamiinae, containing the following species:

- Fredlanea aequatoria (Bates, 1881)
- Fredlanea calliste (Bates, 1881)
- Fredlanea colombiana (Lane, 1966)
- Fredlanea consobrina (Lane, 1970)
- Fredlanea cymatilis (Lane, 1966)
- Fredlanea flavipennis (Lane, 1966)
- Fredlanea guaranitica (Lane, 1966)
- Fredlanea hiekei (Fuchs, 1970)
- Fredlanea hovorei Galileo & Martins, 2005
- Fredlanea kirschi (Aurivillius, 1923)
- Fredlanea maculata Martins & Galileo, 1996
- Fredlanea putiapitanga Galileo & Martins, 1999
- Fredlanea velutina (Lane, 1966)
- Fredlanea vilhena Martins & Galileo, 1997
- Fredlanea virginea (Fabricius, 1801)
- Fredlanea viridipennis (Bates, 1885)
