= Anisopodus nigripes =

Scientific classification
- Kingdom: Animalia
- Phylum: Arthropoda
- Class: Insecta
- Order: Coleoptera
- Suborder: Polyphaga
- Infraorder: Cucujiformia
- Family: Cerambycidae
- Genus: Anisopodus
- Species: A. macropus

Binomial name
- Anisopodus macropus Bates, 1885

Species of beetle

Anisopodus nigripes is a species of beetle in the family Cerambycidae that was described by Henry Walter Bates in 1885.
