= Fredlanea kirschi =

Scientific classification
- Domain: Eukaryota
- Kingdom: Animalia
- Phylum: Arthropoda
- Class: Insecta
- Order: Coleoptera
- Suborder: Polyphaga
- Infraorder: Cucujiformia
- Family: Cerambycidae
- Tribe: Hemilophini
- Genus: Fredlanea
- Species: F. kirschi

Binomial name
- Fredlanea kirschi (Aurivillius, 1923)

Species of beetle

Fredlanea kirschi is a species of beetle in the family Cerambycidae. It was described by Per Olof Christopher Aurivillius in 1923. It is known from Colombia and Peru.
