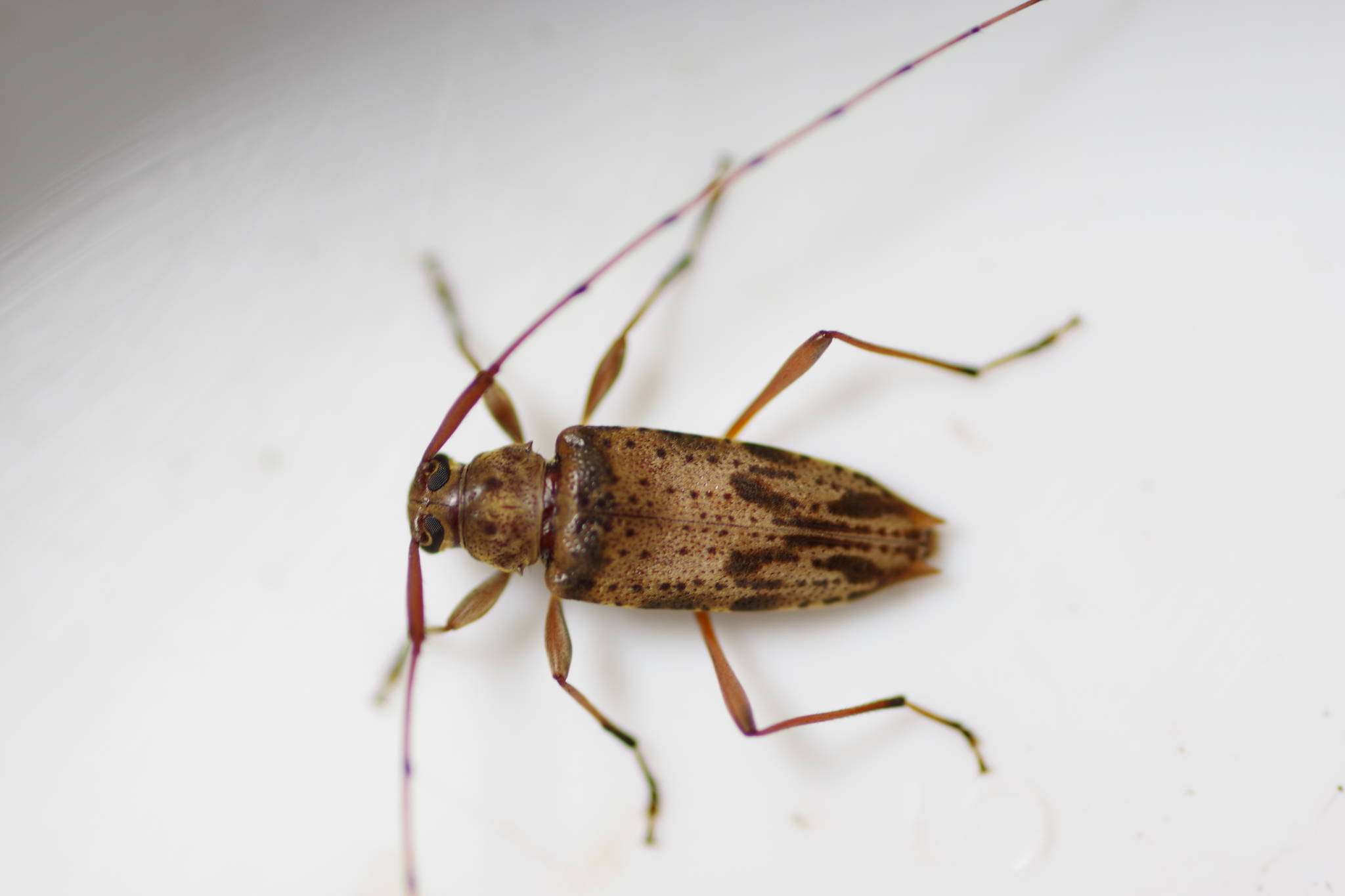

Scientific classification
- Kingdom: Animalia
- Phylum: Arthropoda
- Class: Insecta
- Order: Coleoptera
- Suborder: Polyphaga
- Infraorder: Cucujiformia
- Family: Cerambycidae
- Genus: Anisopodus
- Species: A. scriptipennis

Binomial name
- Anisopodus scriptipennis Bates, 1872

Synonyms
- Anisopus scriptipennis Gemminger & Harold, 1873

= Anisopodus scriptipennis =

Species of beetle

Anisopodus scriptipennis is a species of beetle in the family Cerambycidae that was described by Henry Walter Bates in 1872.
