= Anisopodus mexicanus =

Scientific classification
- Kingdom: Animalia
- Phylum: Arthropoda
- Class: Insecta
- Order: Coleoptera
- Suborder: Polyphaga
- Infraorder: Cucujiformia
- Family: Cerambycidae
- Genus: Anisopodus
- Species: A. mexicanus

Binomial name
- Anisopodus mexicanus Bates, 1881

Synonyms
- Anisopus mexicanus Lameere, 1883

Species of beetle

Anisopodus mexicanus is a species of beetle in the family Cerambycidae that was described by Henry Walter Bates in 1881.
