= Anisopodus elongatus =

Scientific classification
- Kingdom: Animalia
- Phylum: Arthropoda
- Class: Insecta
- Order: Coleoptera
- Suborder: Polyphaga
- Infraorder: Cucujiformia
- Family: Cerambycidae
- Genus: Anisopodus
- Species: A. elongatus

Binomial name
- Anisopodus elongatus Bates, 1863

Synonyms
- Anisopus elongatus Gemminger & Harold, 1873

Species of beetle

Anisopodus elongatus is a species of beetle in the family Cerambycidae that was described by Henry Walter Bates in 1863.

This species is brown with white spots on the back, with antennae that face back around the body and extend past it. It has black spots where the antenna attaches to the head.
