= Anisopodus haliki =

Scientific classification
- Kingdom: Animalia
- Phylum: Arthropoda
- Class: Insecta
- Order: Coleoptera
- Suborder: Polyphaga
- Infraorder: Cucujiformia
- Family: Cerambycidae
- Genus: Anisopodus
- Species: A. haliki

Binomial name
- Anisopodus haliki Martins, 1974

Species of beetle

Anisopodus haliki is a species of beetle in the family Cerambycidae that was described by Martins in 1974.
