= Fredlanea cymatilis =

Scientific classification
- Domain: Eukaryota
- Kingdom: Animalia
- Phylum: Arthropoda
- Class: Insecta
- Order: Coleoptera
- Suborder: Polyphaga
- Infraorder: Cucujiformia
- Family: Cerambycidae
- Tribe: Hemilophini
- Genus: Fredlanea
- Species: F. cymatilis

Binomial name
- Fredlanea cymatilis (Lane, 1966)

Species of beetle

Fredlanea cymatilis is a species of beetle in the family Cerambycidae. It was described by Lane in 1966. It is known from Ecuador and Colombia.
