= Anisopodus consimilis =

Scientific classification
- Kingdom: Animalia
- Phylum: Arthropoda
- Class: Insecta
- Order: Coleoptera
- Suborder: Polyphaga
- Infraorder: Cucujiformia
- Family: Cerambycidae
- Genus: Anisopodus
- Species: A. consimilis

Binomial name
- Anisopodus consimilis Aurivillius, 1922

Species of beetle

Anisopodus consimilis is a species of beetle in the family Cerambycidae that was described by Per Olof Christopher Aurivillius in 1922.
