= Paranisopodus paradoxus =

Scientific classification
- Domain: Eukaryota
- Kingdom: Animalia
- Phylum: Arthropoda
- Class: Insecta
- Order: Coleoptera
- Suborder: Polyphaga
- Infraorder: Cucujiformia
- Family: Cerambycidae
- Genus: Paranisopodus
- Species: P. paradoxus

Binomial name
- Paranisopodus paradoxus Monne & Martins, 1976

Species of beetle

Paranisopodus paradoxus is a species of beetle in the family Cerambycidae. It was described by Monne and Martins in 1976.
