= Anisopodus ligneus =

Scientific classification
- Kingdom: Animalia
- Phylum: Arthropoda
- Class: Insecta
- Order: Coleoptera
- Suborder: Polyphaga
- Infraorder: Cucujiformia
- Family: Cerambycidae
- Genus: Anisopodus
- Species: A. ligneus

Binomial name
- Anisopodus ligneus Bates, 1863

Synonyms
- Anisopus ligneus Gemminger & Harold, 1873

Species of beetle

Anisopodus ligneus is a species of beetle in the family Cerambycidae that was described by Henry Walter Bates in 1863.
