= Anisopodus melzeri =

Scientific classification
- Kingdom: Animalia
- Phylum: Arthropoda
- Class: Insecta
- Order: Coleoptera
- Suborder: Polyphaga
- Infraorder: Cucujiformia
- Family: Cerambycidae
- Genus: Anisopodus
- Species: A. melzeri

Binomial name
- Anisopodus melzeri Gilmour, 1965

Synonyms
- Anisopodus nigrosparsus Melzer, 1935

Species of beetle

Anisopodus melzeri is a species of beetle in the family Cerambycidae. It was described by Gilmour in 1965. The species are named after entomologist Melzer.
