= Anisopodus subarmatus =

Scientific classification
- Kingdom: Animalia
- Phylum: Arthropoda
- Class: Insecta
- Order: Coleoptera
- Suborder: Polyphaga
- Infraorder: Cucujiformia
- Family: Cerambycidae
- Genus: Anisopodus
- Species: A. subarmatus

Binomial name
- Anisopodus subarmatus Melzer, 1931

Species of beetle

Anisopodus subarmatus is a species of beetle in the family Cerambycidae that was described by Melzer in 1931.
