= Anisopodus latus =

Scientific classification
- Kingdom: Animalia
- Phylum: Arthropoda
- Class: Insecta
- Order: Coleoptera
- Suborder: Polyphaga
- Infraorder: Cucujiformia
- Family: Cerambycidae
- Genus: Anisopodus
- Species: A. latus

Binomial name
- Anisopodus latus Monné & Martins, 1976

Species of beetle

Anisopodus latus is a species of beetle in the family Cerambycidae that was described by Monné & Martins in 1976.
