= Anisopodus hamaticollis =

Scientific classification
- Kingdom: Animalia
- Phylum: Arthropoda
- Class: Insecta
- Order: Coleoptera
- Suborder: Polyphaga
- Infraorder: Cucujiformia
- Family: Cerambycidae
- Genus: Anisopodus
- Species: A. hamaticollis

Binomial name
- Anisopodus hamaticollis Bates, 1872

Synonyms
- Anisopus hamaticollis Gemminger & Harold, 1873

Species of beetle

Anisopodus hamaticollis is a species of beetle in the family Cerambycidae that was described by Henry Walter Bates in 1872.
