= Anisopodus hiekei =

Scientific classification
- Kingdom: Animalia
- Phylum: Arthropoda
- Class: Insecta
- Order: Coleoptera
- Suborder: Polyphaga
- Infraorder: Cucujiformia
- Family: Cerambycidae
- Genus: Anisopodus
- Species: A. hiekei

Binomial name
- Anisopodus hiekei Martins, 1974

Synonyms
- Anisopodus phalangodes Bates, 1872

Species of beetle

Anisopodus hiekei is a species of beetle in the family Cerambycidae that was described by Martins in 1974.
