= Fredlanea hiekei =

Scientific classification
- Kingdom: Animalia
- Phylum: Arthropoda
- Clade: Pancrustacea
- Class: Insecta
- Order: Coleoptera
- Suborder: Polyphaga
- Infraorder: Cucujiformia
- Family: Cerambycidae
- Genus: Fredlanea
- Species: F. hiekei

Binomial name
- Fredlanea hiekei (E. Fuchs, 1970)

Synonyms
- Adesmus hiekei E. Fuchs, 1970

Species of beetle

Fredlanea hiekei is a species of beetle in the family Cerambycidae. It was described by Ernst Fuchs in 1970, originally under the genus Adesmus. It is known from Ecuador and Colombia.
