= Itumbiara explanata =

Scientific classification
- Domain: Eukaryota
- Kingdom: Animalia
- Phylum: Arthropoda
- Class: Insecta
- Order: Coleoptera
- Suborder: Polyphaga
- Infraorder: Cucujiformia
- Family: Cerambycidae
- Tribe: Hemilophini
- Genus: Itumbiara
- Species: I. explanata

Binomial name
- Itumbiara explanata (Bates, 1885)

Synonyms
- Isomerida explanata Bates, 1885; Spathoptera explanata (Bates) Gilmour, 1965

Species of beetle

Itumbiara explanata is a species of beetle in the family Cerambycidae. It was described by Henry Walter Bates in 1885, originally under the genus Isomerida. It is known from Panama.
