= Itumbiara picticornis =

Scientific classification
- Domain: Eukaryota
- Kingdom: Animalia
- Phylum: Arthropoda
- Class: Insecta
- Order: Coleoptera
- Suborder: Polyphaga
- Infraorder: Cucujiformia
- Family: Cerambycidae
- Tribe: Hemilophini
- Genus: Itumbiara
- Species: I. picticornis

Binomial name
- Itumbiara picticornis (Bates, 1872)

Synonyms
- Hemilophus picticornis Gemminger & Harold, 1873; Isomerida picticornis Bates, 1881; Spathoptera picticornis Gilmour, 1965

Species of beetle

Itumbiara picticornis is a species of beetle in the family Cerambycidae. It was described by Henry Walter Bates in 1872. It is known from Costa Rica, Nicaragua and Panama.
