= Isomerida paraiba =

Scientific classification
- Domain: Eukaryota
- Kingdom: Animalia
- Phylum: Arthropoda
- Class: Insecta
- Order: Coleoptera
- Suborder: Polyphaga
- Infraorder: Cucujiformia
- Family: Cerambycidae
- Tribe: Hemilophini
- Genus: Isomerida
- Species: I. paraiba

Binomial name
- Isomerida paraiba Galileo & Martins, 1996

Species of beetle

Isomerida paraiba is a species of beetle in the family Cerambycidae. It was described by Galileo and Martins in 1996. It is known from Brazil.
