= Isomerida ibitira =

Scientific classification
- Domain: Eukaryota
- Kingdom: Animalia
- Phylum: Arthropoda
- Class: Insecta
- Order: Coleoptera
- Suborder: Polyphaga
- Infraorder: Cucujiformia
- Family: Cerambycidae
- Tribe: Hemilophini
- Genus: Isomerida
- Species: I. ibitira

Binomial name
- Isomerida ibitira Martins & Galileo, 1992

Species of beetle

Isomerida ibitira is a species of beetle in the family Cerambycidae. It was described by Martins and Galileo in 1992. It is known from Brazil.
