= Itumbiara cuici =

Scientific classification
- Domain: Eukaryota
- Kingdom: Animalia
- Phylum: Arthropoda
- Class: Insecta
- Order: Coleoptera
- Suborder: Polyphaga
- Infraorder: Cucujiformia
- Family: Cerambycidae
- Tribe: Hemilophini
- Genus: Itumbiara
- Species: I. cuici

Binomial name
- Itumbiara cuici Galileo & Martins, 1997

Species of beetle

Itumbiara cuici is a species of beetle in the family Cerambycidae. It was described by Galileo and Martins in 1997. It is known from Brazil.
