= Isomerida tupi =

Scientific classification
- Domain: Eukaryota
- Kingdom: Animalia
- Phylum: Arthropoda
- Class: Insecta
- Order: Coleoptera
- Suborder: Polyphaga
- Infraorder: Cucujiformia
- Family: Cerambycidae
- Tribe: Hemilophini
- Genus: Isomerida
- Species: I. tupi

Binomial name
- Isomerida tupi Martins & Galileo, 1992

Species of beetle

Isomerida tupi is a species of beetle in the family Cerambycidae. It was described by Martins and Galileo in 1992. It is known from Brazil and Colombia.
