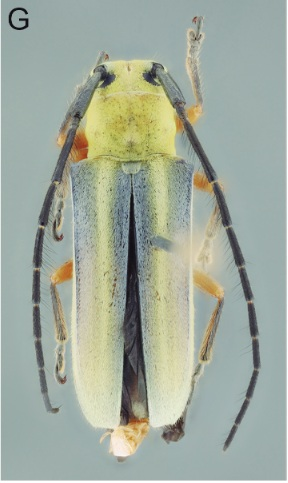

Scientific classification
- Kingdom: Animalia
- Phylum: Arthropoda
- Clade: Pancrustacea
- Class: Insecta
- Order: Coleoptera
- Suborder: Polyphaga
- Infraorder: Cucujiformia
- Family: Cerambycidae
- Genus: Isomerida
- Species: I. vittata

Binomial name
- Isomerida vittata (Pascoe, 1859)

Synonyms
- Amphionycha vittata Pascoe, 1858; Amphionycha strigata Redtenbacher, 1868

= Isomerida vittata =

Species of beetle

Isomerida vittata is a species of beetle in the family Cerambycidae. It was described by Francis Polkinghorne Pascoe in 1859. It is found in Brazil (Bahia, Minas Gerais, Espirito Santo, Rio de Janeiro, São Paulo).
