= Itumbiara crinicornis =

Scientific classification
- Domain: Eukaryota
- Kingdom: Animalia
- Phylum: Arthropoda
- Class: Insecta
- Order: Coleoptera
- Suborder: Polyphaga
- Infraorder: Cucujiformia
- Family: Cerambycidae
- Tribe: Hemilophini
- Genus: Itumbiara
- Species: I. crinicornis

Binomial name
- Itumbiara crinicornis (Germar, 1824)

Synonyms
- Hemilophus crinicornis Gemminger & Harold, 1873; Isomerida crinicornis Lacordaire, 1872; Saperda crinicornis Germar, 1824; Spathoptera crinicornis Germar, 1839

Species of beetle

Itumbiara crinicornis is a species of beetle in the family Cerambycidae. It was described by Ernst Friedrich Germar in 1824. It is known from Brazil.
