= Itumbiara taigaiba =

Scientific classification
- Kingdom: Animalia
- Phylum: Arthropoda
- Clade: Pancrustacea
- Class: Insecta
- Order: Coleoptera
- Suborder: Polyphaga
- Infraorder: Cucujiformia
- Family: Cerambycidae
- Genus: Itumbiara
- Species: I. taigaiba

Binomial name
- Itumbiara taigaiba Martins & Galileo, 1992

Species of beetle

Itumbiara taigaiba is a species of beetle in the family Cerambycidae. It was described by Martins and Galileo in 1992. It is known from Brazil (São Paulo, Paraná, Santa Catarina, Rio Grande do Sul).
