= Itumbiara fimbriata =

Scientific classification
- Domain: Eukaryota
- Kingdom: Animalia
- Phylum: Arthropoda
- Class: Insecta
- Order: Coleoptera
- Suborder: Polyphaga
- Infraorder: Cucujiformia
- Family: Cerambycidae
- Tribe: Hemilophini
- Genus: Itumbiara
- Species: I. fimbriata

Binomial name
- Itumbiara fimbriata (Bates, 1881)

Synonyms
- Hemilophus fimbriatus Lameere, 1883; Isomerida fimbriata Bates, 1881; Spathoptera fimbriata Gilmour, 1965

Species of beetle

Itumbiara fimbriata is a species of beetle in the family Cerambycidae. It was described by Henry Walter Bates in 1881. It is known from Brazil.
