= Itumbiara subdilatata =

Scientific classification
- Domain: Eukaryota
- Kingdom: Animalia
- Phylum: Arthropoda
- Class: Insecta
- Order: Coleoptera
- Suborder: Polyphaga
- Infraorder: Cucujiformia
- Family: Cerambycidae
- Tribe: Hemilophini
- Genus: Itumbiara
- Species: I. subdilatata

Binomial name
- Itumbiara subdilatata (Bates, 1872)

Synonyms
- Hemilophus dilatatus Gemminger & Harold, 1873; Isomerida subdilatata Bates, 1872; Spathoptera subdilatata Gilmour, 1965

Species of beetle

Itumbiara subdilatata is a species of beetle in the family Cerambycidae. It was described by Henry Walter Bates in 1872. It is known from Nicaragua, Costa Rica and Panama.
