= Isomerida sergioi =

Scientific classification
- Kingdom: Animalia
- Phylum: Arthropoda
- Class: Insecta
- Order: Coleoptera
- Suborder: Polyphaga
- Infraorder: Cucujiformia
- Family: Cerambycidae
- Genus: Isomerida
- Species: I. sergioi

Binomial name
- Isomerida sergioi Galileo & Martins, 2009

Species of beetle

Isomerida sergioi is a species of beetle in the family Cerambycidae. It was described by Galileo and Martins in 2009. It is known from Bolivia.
