= Isomerida cinctiventris =

Scientific classification
- Domain: Eukaryota
- Kingdom: Animalia
- Phylum: Arthropoda
- Class: Insecta
- Order: Coleoptera
- Suborder: Polyphaga
- Infraorder: Cucujiformia
- Family: Cerambycidae
- Tribe: Hemilophini
- Genus: Isomerida
- Species: I. cinctiventris

Binomial name
- Isomerida cinctiventris Bates, 1885

Species of beetle

Isomerida cinctiventris is a species of beetle in the family Cerambycidae. It was described by Henry Walter Bates in 1885. It is known from Panama and Costa Rica.
