= Isomerida lineata =

Scientific classification
- Domain: Eukaryota
- Kingdom: Animalia
- Phylum: Arthropoda
- Class: Insecta
- Order: Coleoptera
- Suborder: Polyphaga
- Infraorder: Cucujiformia
- Family: Cerambycidae
- Tribe: Hemilophini
- Genus: Isomerida
- Species: I. lineata

Binomial name
- Isomerida lineata Bates, 1874

Species of beetle

Isomerida lineata is a species of beetle in the family Cerambycidae. It was described by Henry Walter Bates in 1874. It is known from Brazil, Bolivia, Colombia, Nicaragua and Peru.
