= Itumbiara (beetle) =

Scientific classification
- Domain: Eukaryota
- Kingdom: Animalia
- Phylum: Arthropoda
- Class: Insecta
- Order: Coleoptera
- Suborder: Polyphaga
- Infraorder: Cucujiformia
- Family: Cerambycidae
- Subfamily: Lamiinae
- Tribe: Hemilophini
- Genus: Itumbiara; Martins & Galileo, 1992

Genus of beetles

Itumbiara is a genus of longhorn beetles of the subfamily Lamiinae, containing the following species:

- Itumbiara crinicornis (Germar, 1824)
- Itumbiara cuici Galileo & Martins, 1997
- Itumbiara denudata Galileo & Martins, 2005
- Itumbiara explanata (Bates, 1885)
- Itumbiara fimbriata (Bates, 1881)
- Itumbiara picticollis (Bates, 1881)
- Itumbiara picticornis (Bates, 1872)
- Itumbiara plumosa (Bates, 1881)
- Itumbiara subdilatata (Bates, 1872)
- Itumbiara taigaiba Martins & Galileo, 1992
