= Isomerida santamarta =

Scientific classification
- Domain: Eukaryota
- Kingdom: Animalia
- Phylum: Arthropoda
- Class: Insecta
- Order: Coleoptera
- Suborder: Polyphaga
- Infraorder: Cucujiformia
- Family: Cerambycidae
- Tribe: Hemilophini
- Genus: Isomerida
- Species: I. santamarta

Binomial name
- Isomerida santamarta Galileo & Martins, 2001

Species of beetle

Isomerida santamarta is a species of beetle in the family Cerambycidae. It was described by Galileo and Martins in 2001. It is known from Colombia.
