= Isomerida albicollis =

Scientific classification
- Domain: Eukaryota
- Kingdom: Animalia
- Phylum: Arthropoda
- Class: Insecta
- Order: Coleoptera
- Suborder: Polyphaga
- Infraorder: Cucujiformia
- Family: Cerambycidae
- Tribe: Hemilophini
- Genus: Isomerida
- Species: I. albicollis

Binomial name
- Isomerida albicollis (Laporte, 1840)

Species of beetle

Isomerida albicollis is a species of beetle in the family Cerambycidae. It was described by Laporte in 1840. It is known from Brazil, French Guiana and Colombia.
