= Isomerida ruficornis =

Scientific classification
- Domain: Eukaryota
- Kingdom: Animalia
- Phylum: Arthropoda
- Class: Insecta
- Order: Coleoptera
- Suborder: Polyphaga
- Infraorder: Cucujiformia
- Family: Cerambycidae
- Tribe: Hemilophini
- Genus: Isomerida
- Species: I. ruficornis

Binomial name
- Isomerida ruficornis Bates, 1866

Species of beetle

Isomerida ruficornis is a species of beetle in the family Cerambycidae. It was described by Henry Walter Bates in 1866. It is known from Brazil.
