= Isomerida =

Scientific classification
- Domain: Eukaryota
- Kingdom: Animalia
- Phylum: Arthropoda
- Class: Insecta
- Order: Coleoptera
- Suborder: Polyphaga
- Infraorder: Cucujiformia
- Family: Cerambycidae
- Tribe: Hemilophini
- Genus: Isomerida

Genus of beetles

Isomerida is a genus of longhorn beetles of the subfamily Lamiinae, containing the following species:

- Isomerida albicollis (Laporte, 1840)
- Isomerida amicta Pascoe, 1866
- Isomerida apiratinga Martins & Galileo, 1992
- Isomerida cinctiventris Bates, 1885
- Isomerida ibitira Martins & Galileo, 1992
- Isomerida invicta Galileo & Martins, 1996
- Isomerida lanifica (Germar, 1824)
- Isomerida lineata Bates, 1874
- Isomerida longicornis Bates, 1881
- Isomerida paraba Galileo & Martins, 2001
- Isomerida paraiba Galileo & Martins, 1996
- Isomerida ruficornis Bates, 1866
- Isomerida santamarta Galileo & Martins, 2001
- Isomerida separata Galileo & Martins, 1996
- Isomerida sergioi Galileo & Martins, 2009
- Isomerida sororcula Galileo & Martins, 1996
- Isomerida tupi Martins & Galileo, 1992
- Isomerida vittata (Pascoe, 1859)
