= Eranina argentina =

Scientific classification
- Kingdom: Animalia
- Phylum: Arthropoda
- Class: Insecta
- Order: Coleoptera
- Suborder: Polyphaga
- Infraorder: Cucujiformia
- Family: Cerambycidae
- Genus: Eranina
- Species: E. argentina

Binomial name
- Eranina argentina (Bruch, 1911)

Species of beetle

Eranina argentina is a species of beetle in the family Cerambycidae. It was described by Bruch in 1911. It is known from Argentina and Paraguay.
