= Eranina tauaira =

Scientific classification
- Kingdom: Animalia
- Phylum: Arthropoda
- Class: Insecta
- Order: Coleoptera
- Suborder: Polyphaga
- Infraorder: Cucujiformia
- Family: Cerambycidae
- Genus: Eranina
- Species: E. tauaira

Binomial name
- Eranina tauaira (Martins & Galileo, 1993)

Species of beetle

Eranina tauaira is a species of beetle in the family Cerambycidae. It was described by Martins and Galileo in 1993. It is known from Colombia.
