= Eranina humeralis =

Scientific classification
- Kingdom: Animalia
- Phylum: Arthropoda
- Class: Insecta
- Order: Coleoptera
- Suborder: Polyphaga
- Infraorder: Cucujiformia
- Family: Cerambycidae
- Genus: Eranina
- Species: E. humeralis

Binomial name
- Eranina humeralis (Martins & Galileo, 1989)

Species of beetle

Eranina humeralis is a species of beetle in the family Cerambycidae. It was described by Martins and Galileo in 1989. It is known from Bolivia.
