= Eranina costaricensis =

Scientific classification
- Kingdom: Animalia
- Phylum: Arthropoda
- Class: Insecta
- Order: Coleoptera
- Suborder: Polyphaga
- Infraorder: Cucujiformia
- Family: Cerambycidae
- Genus: Eranina
- Species: E. costaricensis

Binomial name
- Eranina costaricensis (Galileo & Martins, 2005)

Species of beetle

Eranina costaricensis is a species of beetle in the family Cerambycidae. It was described by Galileo and Martins in 2005. It is known from Costa Rica.
