= Eranina nigrita =

Scientific classification
- Kingdom: Animalia
- Phylum: Arthropoda
- Class: Insecta
- Order: Coleoptera
- Suborder: Polyphaga
- Infraorder: Cucujiformia
- Family: Cerambycidae
- Genus: Eranina
- Species: E. nigrita

Binomial name
- Eranina nigrita (Galileo & Martins, 1991)

Species of beetle

Eranina nigrita is a species of beetle in the family Cerambycidae. It was described by Galileo and Martins in 1991. It is known from Brazil.
