= Eranina =

Scientific classification
- Domain: Eukaryota
- Kingdom: Animalia
- Phylum: Arthropoda
- Class: Insecta
- Order: Coleoptera
- Suborder: Polyphaga
- Infraorder: Cucujiformia
- Family: Cerambycidae
- Subfamily: Lamiinae
- Tribe: Hemilophini
- Genus: Eranina; Monné, 2005

Genus of beetles

Eranina is a genus of longhorn beetles of the subfamily Lamiinae, containing the following species:

- Eranina argentina (Bruch, 1911)
- Eranina atatinga (Galileo & Martins, 1999)
- Eranina cendira (Bates, 1866)
- Eranina ciliata (Fisher, 1938)
- Eranina cincticornis (Bates, 1866)
- Eranina costaricensis (Galileo & Martins, 2005)
- Eranina cretaria (Galileo & Martins, 2005)
- Eranina curuca (Galileo & Martins, 1999)
- Eranina diana (Martins & Galileo, 1989)
- Eranina dispar (Bates, 1881)
- Eranina esquinas Galileo & Martins, 2008
- Eranina flaviventris (Galileo & Martins, 2005)
- Eranina florula (Bates, 1881)
- Eranina fuliginella (Bates, 1885)
- Eranina fulveola (Bates, 1881)
- Eranina hovorei Galileo & Martins, 2008
- Eranina humeralis (Martins & Galileo, 1989)
- Eranina icambi (Galileo & Martins, 1999)
- Eranina leuconoe (Bates, 1881)
- Eranina meyeri (Martins & Galileo, 1989)
- Eranina moysesi Galileo & Martins, 2008
- Eranina nigrita (Galileo & Martins, 1991)
- Eranina pallidula (Martins & Galileo, 1989)
- Eranina pectoralis (Bates, 1881)
- Eranina piriana (Martins & Galileo, 1993)
- Eranina piterpe Galileo & Martins, 2007
- Eranina porongaba (Galileo & Martins, 1998)
- Eranina pusilla (Bates, 1874)
- Eranina rondonia Galileo & Martins, 2008
- Eranina rosea (Galileo & Martins, 2004)
- Eranina septuosa (Galileo & Martins, 2004)
- Eranina suavissima (Bates, 1881)
- Eranina tauaira (Martins & Galileo, 1993)
- Eranina univittata (Bates, 1881)
