= Eranina cincticornis =

Scientific classification
- Kingdom: Animalia
- Phylum: Arthropoda
- Class: Insecta
- Order: Coleoptera
- Suborder: Polyphaga
- Infraorder: Cucujiformia
- Family: Cerambycidae
- Genus: Eranina
- Species: E. cincticornis

Binomial name
- Eranina cincticornis (Bates, 1866)

Species of beetle

Eranina cincticornis is a species of beetle in the family Cerambycidae. It was described by Bates in 1866.
