= Eranina pusilla =

Scientific classification
- Kingdom: Animalia
- Phylum: Arthropoda
- Class: Insecta
- Order: Coleoptera
- Suborder: Polyphaga
- Infraorder: Cucujiformia
- Family: Cerambycidae
- Genus: Eranina
- Species: E. pusilla

Binomial name
- Eranina pusilla (Bates, 1874)

Species of beetle

Eranina pusilla is a species of beetle in the family Cerambycidae. It was described by Bates in 1874. It is known from Costa Rica and Mexico.
