= Eranina leuconoe =

Scientific classification
- Kingdom: Animalia
- Phylum: Arthropoda
- Class: Insecta
- Order: Coleoptera
- Suborder: Polyphaga
- Infraorder: Cucujiformia
- Family: Cerambycidae
- Genus: Eranina
- Species: E. leuconoe

Binomial name
- Eranina leuconoe (Bates, 1881)

Species of beetle

Eranina leuconoe is a species of beetle in the family Cerambycidae. It was described by Bates in 1881. It is known from Panama and Nicaragua.
