= Eranina icambi =

Scientific classification
- Kingdom: Animalia
- Phylum: Arthropoda
- Class: Insecta
- Order: Coleoptera
- Suborder: Polyphaga
- Infraorder: Cucujiformia
- Family: Cerambycidae
- Genus: Eranina
- Species: E. icambi

Binomial name
- Eranina icambi (Galileo & Martins, 1999)

Species of beetle

Eranina icambi is a species of beetle in the family Cerambycidae. It was described by Galileo and Martins in 1999. It is known from Colombia.
