= Eranina cendira =

Scientific classification
- Kingdom: Animalia
- Phylum: Arthropoda
- Class: Insecta
- Order: Coleoptera
- Suborder: Polyphaga
- Infraorder: Cucujiformia
- Family: Cerambycidae
- Genus: Eranina
- Species: E. cendira

Binomial name
- Eranina cendira (Bates, 1866)

Species of beetle

Eranina cendira is a species of beetle in the family Cerambycidae. It was described by Bates in 1866. It is known from French Guiana and Brazil.
