= Eranina fuliginella =

Scientific classification
- Kingdom: Animalia
- Phylum: Arthropoda
- Class: Insecta
- Order: Coleoptera
- Suborder: Polyphaga
- Infraorder: Cucujiformia
- Family: Cerambycidae
- Genus: Eranina
- Species: E. fuliginella

Binomial name
- Eranina fuliginella (Bates, 1885)

Species of beetle

Eranina fuliginella is a species of beetle in the family Cerambycidae. It was described by Bates in 1885. It is known from Guatemala.
