= Malacoscylus lacordairei =

Scientific classification
- Domain: Eukaryota
- Kingdom: Animalia
- Phylum: Arthropoda
- Class: Insecta
- Order: Coleoptera
- Suborder: Polyphaga
- Infraorder: Cucujiformia
- Family: Cerambycidae
- Tribe: Hemilophini
- Genus: Malacoscylus
- Species: M. lacordairei

Binomial name
- Malacoscylus lacordairei (Thomson, 1868)

Species of beetle

Malacoscylus lacordairei is a species of beetle in the family Cerambycidae. It was described by James Thomson in 1868. It is known from Colombia.
