= Malacoscylus elegantulus =

Scientific classification
- Domain: Eukaryota
- Kingdom: Animalia
- Phylum: Arthropoda
- Class: Insecta
- Order: Coleoptera
- Suborder: Polyphaga
- Infraorder: Cucujiformia
- Family: Cerambycidae
- Tribe: Hemilophini
- Genus: Malacoscylus
- Species: M. elegantulus

Binomial name
- Malacoscylus elegantulus Galileo & Martins, 2005

Species of beetle

Malacoscylus elegantulus is a species of beetle in the family Cerambycidae. It was described by Galileo and Martins in 2005. It is known from Peru.
