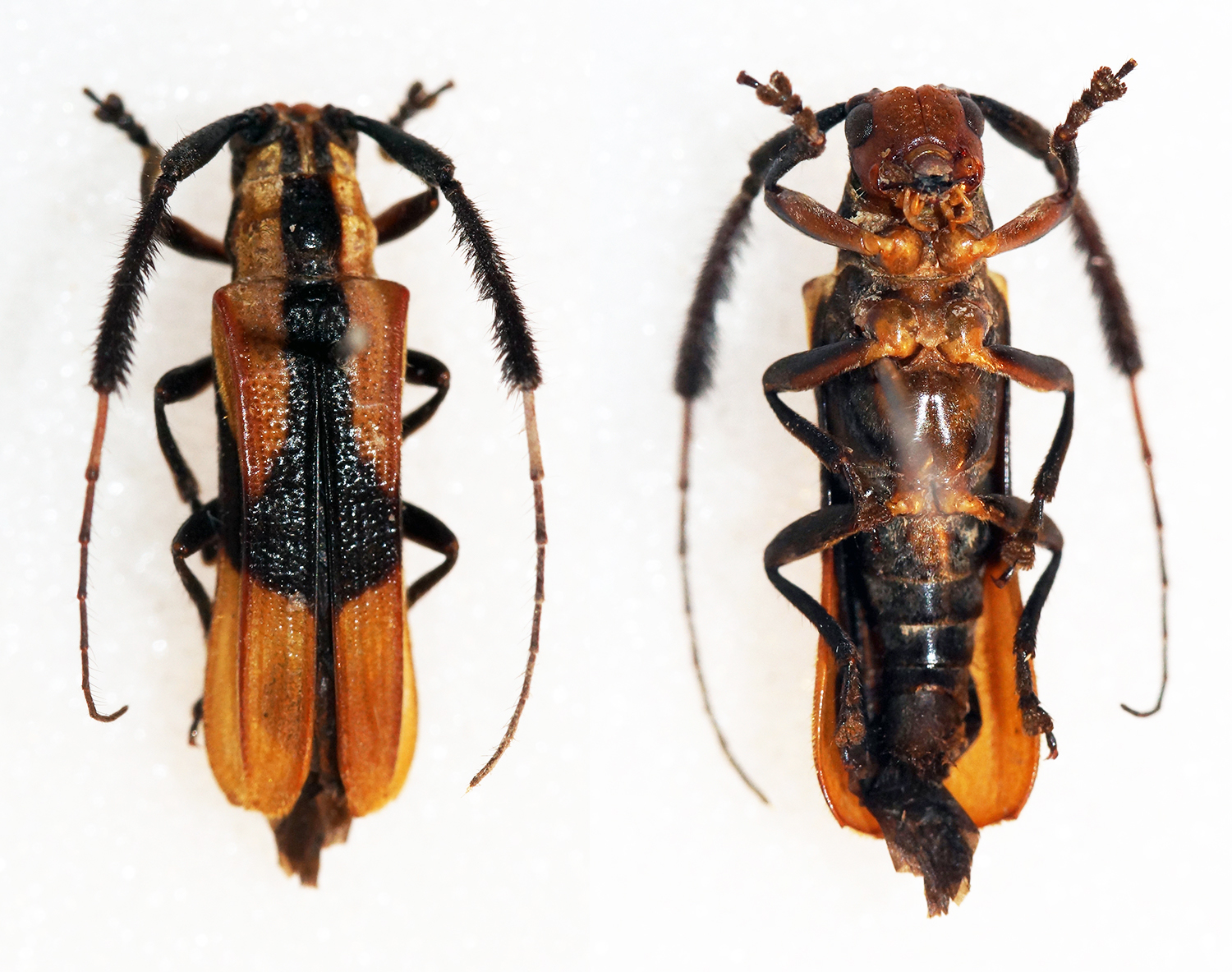
- Malacoscylus auricomus

Scientific classification
- Domain: Eukaryota
- Kingdom: Animalia
- Phylum: Arthropoda
- Class: Insecta
- Order: Coleoptera
- Suborder: Polyphaga
- Infraorder: Cucujiformia
- Family: Cerambycidae
- Tribe: Hemilophini
- Genus: Malacoscylus

= Malacoscylus =

Genus of beetles

Malacoscylus is a genus of longhorn beetles of the subfamily Lamiinae, containing the following species:

- Malacoscylus auricomus Bates, 1881
- Malacoscylus cinctulus Bates, 1881
- Malacoscylus cirratus (Germar, 1824)
- Malacoscylus elegantulus Galileo & Martins, 2005
- Malacoscylus fasciatus Galileo & Martins, 1998
- Malacoscylus gonostigma Bates, 1881
- Malacoscylus gratiosus Bates, 1881
- Malacoscylus lacordairei (Thomson, 1868)
- Malacoscylus lanei Martins & Galileo, 1991
- Malacoscylus niger Aurivillius, 1908
- Malacoscylus xanthotaenius (Bates, 1881)
