= Malacoscylus niger =

Scientific classification
- Domain: Eukaryota
- Kingdom: Animalia
- Phylum: Arthropoda
- Class: Insecta
- Order: Coleoptera
- Suborder: Polyphaga
- Infraorder: Cucujiformia
- Family: Cerambycidae
- Tribe: Hemilophini
- Genus: Malacoscylus
- Species: M. niger

Binomial name
- Malacoscylus niger Aurivillius, 1908

Species of beetle

Malacoscylus niger is a species of beetle in the family Cerambycidae. It was described by Per Olof Christopher Aurivillius in 1908 and is known from Peru.
