= Malacoscylus gratiosus =

Scientific classification
- Domain: Eukaryota
- Kingdom: Animalia
- Phylum: Arthropoda
- Class: Insecta
- Order: Coleoptera
- Suborder: Polyphaga
- Infraorder: Cucujiformia
- Family: Cerambycidae
- Tribe: Hemilophini
- Genus: Malacoscylus
- Species: M. gratiosus

Binomial name
- Malacoscylus gratiosus Bates, 1881

Species of beetle

Malacoscylus gratiosus is a species of beetle in the family Cerambycidae. It was described by Henry Walter Bates in 1881. It is known from Ecuador.
