= Tyrinthia colombiana =

Scientific classification
- Domain: Eukaryota
- Kingdom: Animalia
- Phylum: Arthropoda
- Class: Insecta
- Order: Coleoptera
- Suborder: Polyphaga
- Infraorder: Cucujiformia
- Family: Cerambycidae
- Tribe: Hemilophini
- Genus: Tyrinthia
- Species: T. colombiana

Binomial name
- Tyrinthia colombiana Galileo & Martins, 2009

Species of beetle

Tyrinthia colombiana is a species of beetle in the family Cerambycidae. It was described by Galileo and Martins in 2009. It is known from Colombia.
