= Tyrinthia picticornis =

Scientific classification
- Domain: Eukaryota
- Kingdom: Animalia
- Phylum: Arthropoda
- Class: Insecta
- Order: Coleoptera
- Suborder: Polyphaga
- Infraorder: Cucujiformia
- Family: Cerambycidae
- Tribe: Hemilophini
- Genus: Tyrinthia
- Species: T. picticornis

Binomial name
- Tyrinthia picticornis Martins & Galileo, 1991

Species of beetle

Tyrinthia picticornis is a species of beetle in the family Cerambycidae. It was described by Martins and Galileo in 1991. It is known from Panama.
