= Tyrinthia scissifrons =

Scientific classification
- Domain: Eukaryota
- Kingdom: Animalia
- Phylum: Arthropoda
- Class: Insecta
- Order: Coleoptera
- Suborder: Polyphaga
- Infraorder: Cucujiformia
- Family: Cerambycidae
- Tribe: Hemilophini
- Genus: Tyrinthia
- Species: T. scissifrons

Binomial name
- Tyrinthia scissifrons Bates, 1866

Synonyms
- Cyphometopus infacetus Thomson, 1868; Hemilophus infacetus Gemminger & Harold, 1873; Hemilophus scissifrons Gemminger & Harold, 1873; Tyrinthia infaceta Blackwelder, 1946; Tyrinthia infacetus Bates, 1881

Species of beetle

Tyrinthia scissifrons is a species of beetle in the family Cerambycidae. It was described by Henry Walter Bates in 1866. It is known from French Guiana, Brazil and Trinidad.
