= Tyrinthia photurina =

Scientific classification
- Domain: Eukaryota
- Kingdom: Animalia
- Phylum: Arthropoda
- Class: Insecta
- Order: Coleoptera
- Suborder: Polyphaga
- Infraorder: Cucujiformia
- Family: Cerambycidae
- Tribe: Hemilophini
- Genus: Tyrinthia
- Species: T. photurina

Binomial name
- Tyrinthia photurina Bates, 1885

Synonyms
- Tyrinthia photuroides Linsley, 1961

Species of beetle

Tyrinthia photurina is a species of beetle in the family Cerambycidae. It was described by Henry Walter Bates in 1885. It is known from Panama.
