= Tyrinthia aurantia =

Scientific classification
- Domain: Eukaryota
- Kingdom: Animalia
- Phylum: Arthropoda
- Class: Insecta
- Order: Coleoptera
- Suborder: Polyphaga
- Infraorder: Cucujiformia
- Family: Cerambycidae
- Tribe: Hemilophini
- Genus: Tyrinthia
- Species: T. aurantia

Binomial name
- Tyrinthia aurantia Martins & Galileo, 2007

Species of beetle

Tyrinthia aurantia is a species of beetle in the family Cerambycidae. It was described by Martins and Galileo in 2007. It is known from Ecuador, South America.
