= Tyrinthia klugii =

Scientific classification
- Domain: Eukaryota
- Kingdom: Animalia
- Phylum: Arthropoda
- Class: Insecta
- Order: Coleoptera
- Suborder: Polyphaga
- Infraorder: Cucujiformia
- Family: Cerambycidae
- Tribe: Hemilophini
- Genus: Tyrinthia
- Species: T. klugii

Binomial name
- Tyrinthia klugii (Thomson, 1868)

Synonyms
- Hemilophus klugi Gemminger & Harold, 1873; Malacoscylus klugi Aurivillius, 1923; Malacoscylus klugii Thomson, 1868

Species of beetle

Tyrinthia klugii is a species of beetle in the family Cerambycidae. It was described by James Thomson in 1868. It is known from Colombia.
