= Tyrinthia =

Scientific classification
- Domain: Eukaryota
- Kingdom: Animalia
- Phylum: Arthropoda
- Class: Insecta
- Order: Coleoptera
- Suborder: Polyphaga
- Infraorder: Cucujiformia
- Family: Cerambycidae
- Subfamily: Lamiinae
- Tribe: Hemilophini
- Genus: Tyrinthia; Bates, 1866

Genus of beetles

Tyrinthia is a genus of longhorn beetles of the subfamily Lamiinae, containing the following species:

- Tyrinthia aurantia Martins & Galileo, 2007
- Tyrinthia biformis Bates, 1885
- Tyrinthia capillata Bates, 1866
- Tyrinthia colombiana Galileo & Martins, 2009
- Tyrinthia dionae Martins & Galileo, 2004
- Tyrinthia frontalis (Guérin-Méneville, 1855)
- Tyrinthia klugii (Thomson, 1868)
- Tyrinthia lycinella Bates, 1881
- Tyrinthia moroiuba Martins & Galileo, 1991
- Tyrinthia nigroapicata Galileo & Martins, 2009
- Tyrinthia obtusa Bates, 1881
- Tyrinthia paraba Martins & Galileo, 1991
- Tyrinthia patula Galileo & Martins, 2005
- Tyrinthia photurina Bates, 1885
- Tyrinthia picticornis Martins & Galileo, 1991
- Tyrinthia scissifrons Bates, 1866
- Tyrinthia turuna Martins & Galileo, 1993
- Tyrinthia xanthe Bates, 1881
