= Tyrinthia obtusa =

Scientific classification
- Domain: Eukaryota
- Kingdom: Animalia
- Phylum: Arthropoda
- Class: Insecta
- Order: Coleoptera
- Suborder: Polyphaga
- Infraorder: Cucujiformia
- Family: Cerambycidae
- Tribe: Hemilophini
- Genus: Tyrinthia
- Species: T. obtusa

Binomial name
- Tyrinthia obtusa Bates, 1881

Synonyms
- Hemilophus obtusus Lameere, 1883

Species of beetle

Tyrinthia obtusa is a species of beetle in the family Cerambycidae. It was described by Henry Walter Bates in 1881. It is known from Colombia.
