= Tyrinthia turuna =

Scientific classification
- Domain: Eukaryota
- Kingdom: Animalia
- Phylum: Arthropoda
- Class: Insecta
- Order: Coleoptera
- Suborder: Polyphaga
- Infraorder: Cucujiformia
- Family: Cerambycidae
- Tribe: Hemilophini
- Genus: Tyrinthia
- Species: T. turuna

Binomial name
- Tyrinthia turuna Martins & Galileo, 1993

Species of beetle

Tyrinthia turuna is a species of beetle in the family Cerambycidae. It was described by Martins and Galileo in 1993. It is known from Colombia.
