= Tyrinthia frontalis =

Scientific classification
- Domain: Eukaryota
- Kingdom: Animalia
- Phylum: Arthropoda
- Class: Insecta
- Order: Coleoptera
- Suborder: Polyphaga
- Infraorder: Cucujiformia
- Family: Cerambycidae
- Tribe: Hemilophini
- Genus: Tyrinthia
- Species: T. frontalis

Binomial name
- Tyrinthia frontalis (Guérin-Méneville, 1855)

Synonyms
- Hemilophus frontalis Guérin-Méneville, 1855

Species of beetle

Tyrinthia frontalis is a species of beetle in the family Cerambycidae. It was described by Félix Édouard Guérin-Méneville in 1855. It is known from Ecuador.
