= Hilaroleopsis obesa =

Scientific classification
- Kingdom: Animalia
- Phylum: Arthropoda
- Class: Insecta
- Order: Coleoptera
- Suborder: Polyphaga
- Infraorder: Cucujiformia
- Family: Cerambycidae
- Genus: Hilaroleopsis
- Species: H. obesa

Binomial name
- Hilaroleopsis obesa (Bates, 1881)

Species of beetle

Hilaroleopsis obesa is a species of beetle in the family Cerambycidae. It was described by Bates in 1881. It is known from Guatemala, Honduras and Mexico.
