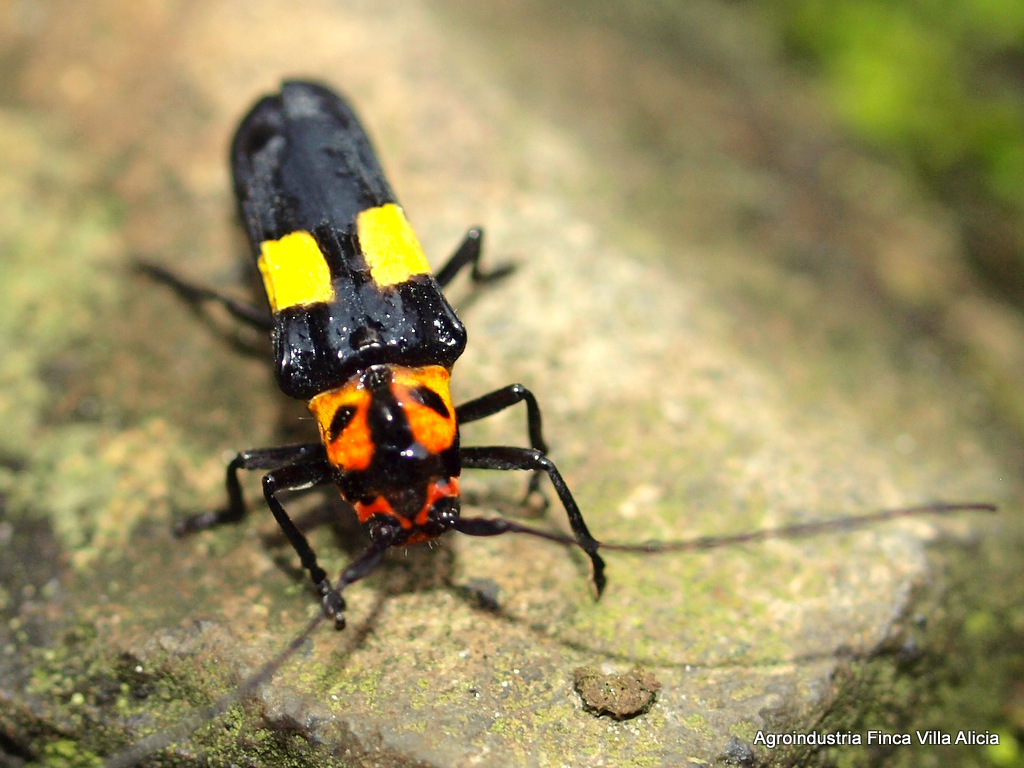

Scientific classification
- Kingdom: Animalia
- Phylum: Arthropoda
- Clade: Pancrustacea
- Class: Insecta
- Order: Coleoptera
- Suborder: Polyphaga
- Infraorder: Cucujiformia
- Family: Cerambycidae
- Genus: Hilaroleopsis
- Species: H. vogti

Binomial name
- Hilaroleopsis vogti Lane, 1970

= Hilaroleopsis vogti =

Species of beetle

Hilaroleopsis vogti is a species of beetle in the family Cerambycidae. It was described by Frederico Lane in 1970. It is known from Guatemala.
