= Hilaroleopsis =

Scientific classification
- Kingdom: Animalia
- Phylum: Arthropoda
- Class: Insecta
- Order: Coleoptera
- Suborder: Polyphaga
- Infraorder: Cucujiformia
- Family: Cerambycidae
- Subfamily: Lamiinae
- Tribe: Hemilophini
- Genus: Hilaroleopsis; Lane, 1970

Genus of beetles

Hilaroleopsis is a genus of longhorn beetles of the subfamily Lamiinae, containing the following species:

- Hilaroleopsis bicarinata (Bates, 1885)
- Hilaroleopsis coloratus Galileo & Martins, 2005
- Hilaroleopsis dimidiata (Bates, 1881)
- Hilaroleopsis globicollis (Bates, 1881)
- Hilaroleopsis icuapira Martins & Galileo, 1992
- Hilaroleopsis minor Martins & Galileo, 1997
- Hilaroleopsis nigerrima Aurivillius, 1923
- Hilaroleopsis obesa (Bates, 1881)
- Hilaroleopsis pituna Galileo & Martins, 2006
- Hilaroleopsis pluricostata (Bates, 1881)
- Hilaroleopsis theurgus Martins & Galileo, 2004
- Hilaroleopsis vogti Lane, 1970
