= Hilaroleopsis nigerrima =

Scientific classification
- Kingdom: Animalia
- Phylum: Arthropoda
- Class: Insecta
- Order: Coleoptera
- Suborder: Polyphaga
- Infraorder: Cucujiformia
- Family: Cerambycidae
- Genus: Hilaroleopsis
- Species: H. nigerrima

Binomial name
- Hilaroleopsis nigerrima Aurivillius, 1923

Species of beetle

Hilaroleopsis nigerrima is a species of beetle in the family Cerambycidae. It was described by Per Olof Christopher Aurivillius in 1923. It is known from Guatemala and Mexico.
