= Essostrutha binotata =

Scientific classification
- Kingdom: Animalia
- Phylum: Arthropoda
- Class: Insecta
- Order: Coleoptera
- Suborder: Polyphaga
- Infraorder: Cucujiformia
- Family: Cerambycidae
- Genus: Essostrutha
- Species: E. binotata

Binomial name
- Essostrutha binotata Bates, 1881

Species of beetle

Essostrutha binotata is a species of beetle in the family Cerambycidae. It was described by Bates in 1881. It is known from Mexico.
