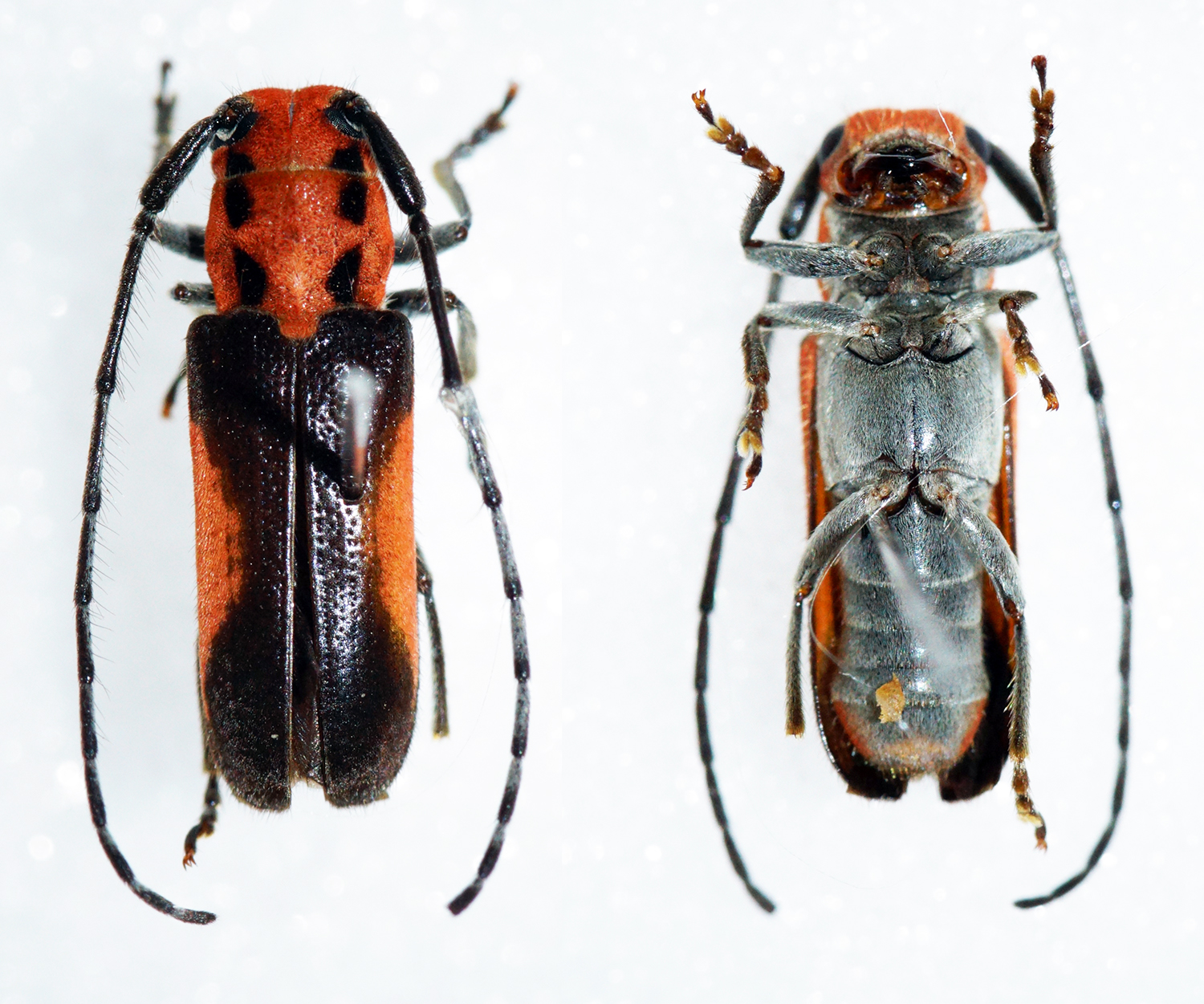

Scientific classification
- Kingdom: Animalia
- Phylum: Arthropoda
- Class: Insecta
- Order: Coleoptera
- Suborder: Polyphaga
- Infraorder: Cucujiformia
- Family: Cerambycidae
- Genus: Essostrutha
- Species: E. laeta

Binomial name
- Essostrutha laeta (Newman, 1840)

= Essostrutha laeta =

Species of beetle

Essostrutha laeta is a species of beetle in the family Cerambycidae. It was described by Newman in 1840. It is known from Guatemala, Mexico, and the United States.
