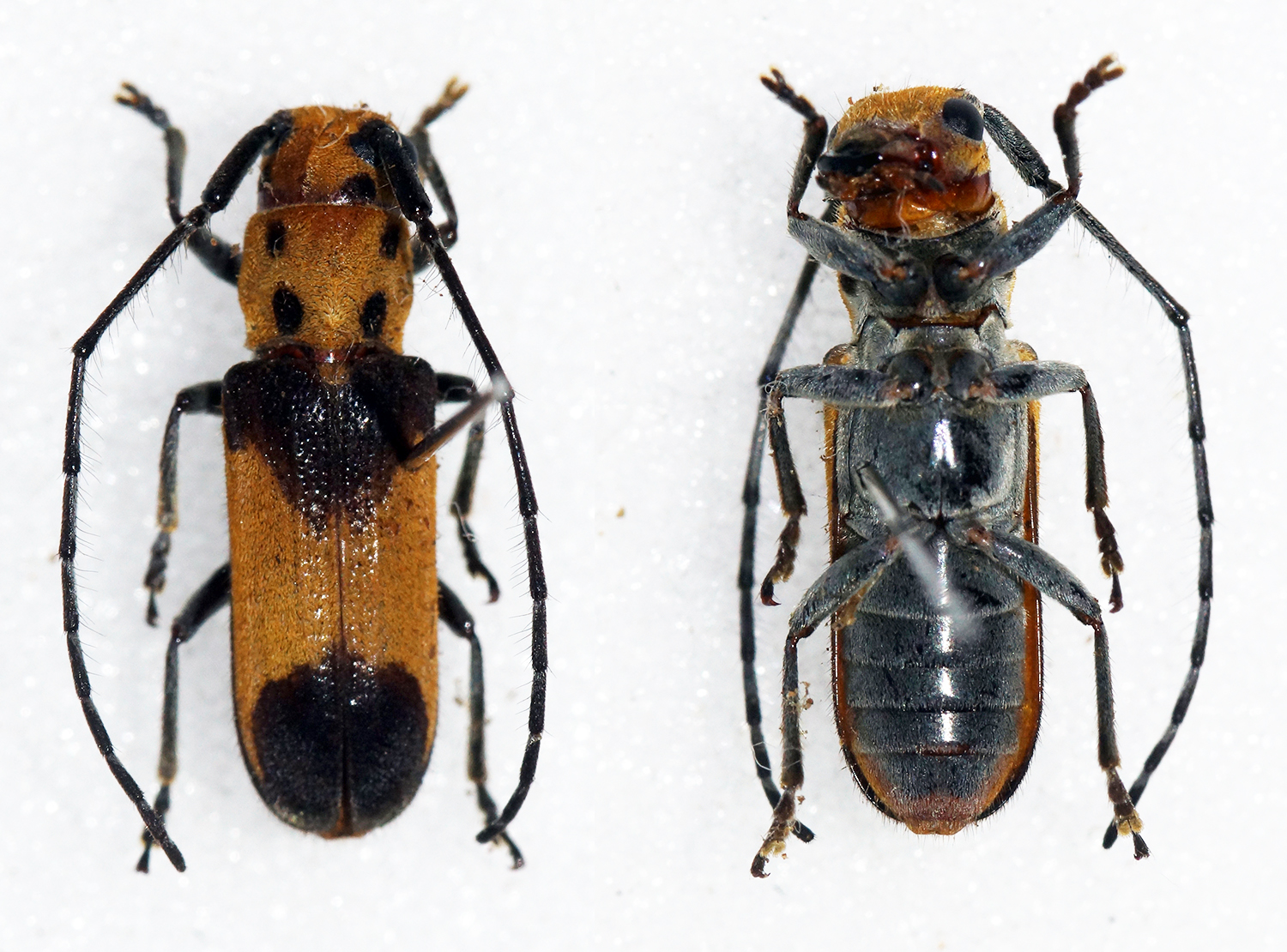
- Essostrutha laeta

Scientific classification
- Kingdom: Animalia
- Phylum: Arthropoda
- Class: Insecta
- Order: Coleoptera
- Suborder: Polyphaga
- Infraorder: Cucujiformia
- Family: Cerambycidae
- Subfamily: Lamiinae
- Tribe: Hemilophini
- Genus: Essostrutha; Thomson, 1868

= Essostrutha =

Genus of beetles

Essostrutha is a genus of longhorn beetles of the subfamily Lamiinae, containing the following species:

- Essostrutha binotata Bates, 1881
- Essostrutha laeta (Newman, 1840)
