= Sybaguasu cornutum =

Scientific classification
- Kingdom: Animalia
- Phylum: Arthropoda
- Class: Insecta
- Order: Coleoptera
- Suborder: Polyphaga
- Infraorder: Cucujiformia
- Family: Cerambycidae
- Genus: Sybaguasu
- Species: S. cornutum

Binomial name
- Sybaguasu cornutum Galileo & Martins, 2005

Species of beetle

Sybaguasu cornutum is a species of beetle in the family Cerambycidae. It was described by Galileo and Martins in 2005. It is known from Brazil.
