= Sybaguasu thoracicum =

Scientific classification
- Kingdom: Animalia
- Phylum: Arthropoda
- Clade: Pancrustacea
- Class: Insecta
- Order: Coleoptera
- Suborder: Polyphaga
- Infraorder: Cucujiformia
- Family: Cerambycidae
- Genus: Sybaguasu
- Species: S. thoracicum

Binomial name
- Sybaguasu thoracicum (Olivier, 1795)

Synonyms
- Sybaguasu thoracicus (Olivier, 1795)

Species of beetle

Sybaguasu thoracicum is a species of beetle in the family Cerambycidae. It was described by Guillaume-Antoine Olivier in 1795. It is known from Brazil and French Guiana.
