= Sybaguasu longipenne =

Scientific classification
- Kingdom: Animalia
- Phylum: Arthropoda
- Clade: Pancrustacea
- Class: Insecta
- Order: Coleoptera
- Suborder: Polyphaga
- Infraorder: Cucujiformia
- Family: Cerambycidae
- Genus: Sybaguasu
- Species: S. longipenne

Binomial name
- Sybaguasu longipenne (Bates, 1881)

Synonyms
- Sybaguasu longipenne (Bates, 1881)

Species of beetle

Sybaguasu longipenne is a species of beetle in the family Cerambycidae. It was described by Henry Walter Bates in 1881. It is known from Ecuador.
