= Sybaguasu titingum =

Scientific classification
- Kingdom: Animalia
- Phylum: Arthropoda
- Class: Insecta
- Order: Coleoptera
- Suborder: Polyphaga
- Infraorder: Cucujiformia
- Family: Cerambycidae
- Genus: Sybaguasu
- Species: S. titingum

Binomial name
- Sybaguasu titingum Martins & Galileo, 1991

Species of beetle

Sybaguasu titingum is a species of beetle in the family Cerambycidae. It was described by Martins and Galileo in 1991. It is known from Peru.
