= Sybaguasu =

Scientific classification
- Kingdom: Animalia
- Phylum: Arthropoda
- Clade: Pancrustacea
- Class: Insecta
- Order: Coleoptera
- Suborder: Polyphaga
- Infraorder: Cucujiformia
- Family: Cerambycidae
- Subfamily: Lamiinae
- Tribe: Hemilophini
- Genus: Sybaguasu; Martins & Galileo, 1991

Genus of beetles

Sybaguasu is a genus of longhorn beetles of the subfamily Lamiinae, containing the following species:

- Sybaguasu anemum Martins & Galileo, 2004
- Sybaguasu cornutum Galileo & Martins, 2005
- Sybaguasu cupreum Galileo & Martins, 2004
- Sybaguasu longipenne (Bates, 1881)
- Sybaguasu mirim Galileo & Martins, 2013
- Sybaguasu murinum (Pascoe, 1866)
- Sybaguasu pubicorne (Bates, 1881)
- Sybaguasu subcarinatum (Bates, 1885)
- Sybaguasu thoracicum (Olivier, 1795)
- Sybaguasu titingum Martins & Galileo, 1991
