= Sybaguasu murinum =

Scientific classification
- Kingdom: Animalia
- Phylum: Arthropoda
- Class: Insecta
- Order: Coleoptera
- Suborder: Polyphaga
- Infraorder: Cucujiformia
- Family: Cerambycidae
- Genus: Sybaguasu
- Species: S. murinum

Binomial name
- Sybaguasu murinum (Pascoe, 1866)

Species of beetle

Sybaguasu murinum is a species of beetle in the family Cerambycidae. It was described by Francis Polkinghorne Pascoe in 1866. It is known from Colombia.
