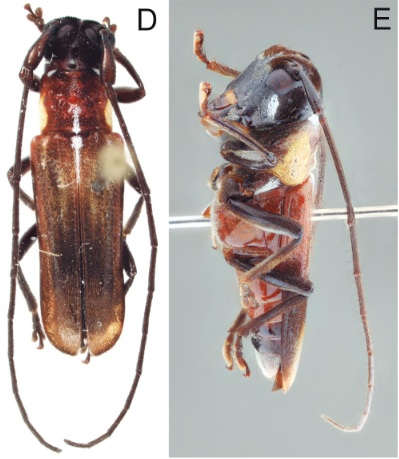

Scientific classification
- Kingdom: Animalia
- Phylum: Arthropoda
- Clade: Pancrustacea
- Class: Insecta
- Order: Coleoptera
- Suborder: Polyphaga
- Infraorder: Cucujiformia
- Family: Cerambycidae
- Genus: Olivensa
- Species: O. megacephala

Binomial name
- Olivensa megacephala (Bates, 1866)

Synonyms
- Amphionycha megacephala Bates, 1866

= Olivensa megacephala =

Species of beetle

Olivensa megacephala is a species of beetle in the family Cerambycidae. It was described by Henry Walter Bates in 1866. It is known from Bolivia, Brazil, French Guiana and Ecuador.
