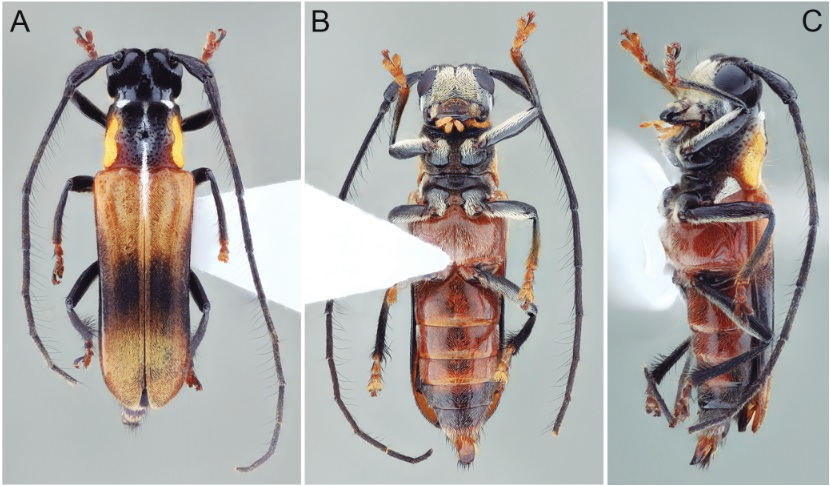

Scientific classification
- Kingdom: Animalia
- Phylum: Arthropoda
- Clade: Pancrustacea
- Class: Insecta
- Order: Coleoptera
- Suborder: Polyphaga
- Infraorder: Cucujiformia
- Family: Cerambycidae
- Genus: Olivensa
- Species: O. ferreirensis

Binomial name
- Olivensa ferreirensis Santos-Silva & Biffi, 2026

= Olivensa ferreirensis =

Species of beetle

Olivensa ferreirensis is a species of beetle of the family Cerambycidae. It is found in Brazil (São Paulo).

== Description ==
Adults reach a length of about 9.55 mm (0.376 in). The head capsule is black, the anteclypeus dark orangish brown with irregular dark-brown areas interspersed and the labrum dark-brown with irregular dark orangish-brown areas interspersed. The basal half of the outer surface of the mandibles is orangish brown, with the remaining surface dark brown. The palpomeres are light yellowish brown and the scape, pedicel, and basal third of antennomere III are black. The apical two-thirds of III and the remaining antennomeres are dark brown. The pronotum is black on the center of the anterior third, dark brown on the remaining central area, and reddish brown laterally. The sides of the prothorax are reddish brown close to the pronotum, and black on the remaining surface. The prosternum is mostly blackish and the prosternal process dark reddish brown with abundant, irregular dark-brown areas interspersed. The mesoventrite is mostly dark brown and the mesoventral process is reddish brown with dark-brown margins. The scutellum is reddish brown and the elytra are orangish-brown on the anterior third, brown on the posterior quarter, and mostly dark brown on the remaining surface, but more blackish dorsally near the suture.

== Etymology ==
The name of the species refers to the type locality, the city of Porto Ferreira, in São Paulo state, Brazil.
