= Olivensa cephalotes =

Scientific classification
- Kingdom: Animalia
- Phylum: Arthropoda
- Class: Insecta
- Order: Coleoptera
- Suborder: Polyphaga
- Infraorder: Cucujiformia
- Family: Cerambycidae
- Genus: Olivensa
- Species: O. cephalotes

Binomial name
- Olivensa cephalotes (Pascoe, 1858)

Species of beetle

Olivensa cephalotes is a species of beetle in the family Cerambycidae. It was described by Francis Polkinghorne Pascoe in 1858. It is known from Brazil, Ecuador and French Guiana.
