= Olivensa =

Scientific classification
- Kingdom: Animalia
- Phylum: Arthropoda
- Clade: Pancrustacea
- Class: Insecta
- Order: Coleoptera
- Suborder: Polyphaga
- Infraorder: Cucujiformia
- Family: Cerambycidae
- Subfamily: Lamiinae
- Tribe: Hemilophini
- Genus: Olivensa; Lane, 1965

Genus of beetles

Olivensa is a genus of longhorn beetles of the subfamily Lamiinae, containing the following species:

- Olivensa cephalotes (Pascoe, 1858)
- Olivensa ferreirensis Santos-Silva & Biffi, 2026
- Olivensa megacephala (Bates, 1866)
- Olivensa mimula Lane, 1965
- Olivensa sonzognii Dalens & Robin, 2019
