= Olivensa mimula =

Scientific classification
- Kingdom: Animalia
- Phylum: Arthropoda
- Class: Insecta
- Order: Coleoptera
- Suborder: Polyphaga
- Infraorder: Cucujiformia
- Family: Cerambycidae
- Genus: Olivensa
- Species: O. mimula

Binomial name
- Olivensa mimula Lane, 1965

Species of beetle

Olivensa mimula is a species of beetle in the family Cerambycidae. It was described by Lane in 1965. It is known from Brazil and Colombia.
