= Woytkowskia =

Woytkowskia may refer to:

- Woytkowskia (beetle) Lane, 1966, a genus of insects in the family Cerambycidae
- Woytkowskia (plant) Woodson, a genus of plants in the family Apocynaceae, considered a synonym of Tabernaemontana
