= Woytkowskia scorpiona =

Scientific classification
- Kingdom: Animalia
- Phylum: Arthropoda
- Class: Insecta
- Order: Coleoptera
- Suborder: Polyphaga
- Infraorder: Cucujiformia
- Family: Cerambycidae
- Genus: Woytkowskia
- Species: W. scorpiona

Binomial name
- Woytkowskia scorpiona Lane, 1966

Species of beetle

Woytkowskia scorpiona is a species of beetle in the family Cerambycidae. It was described by Lane in 1966. It is known from Peru.
