= Woytkowskia gruberi =

Scientific classification
- Kingdom: Animalia
- Phylum: Arthropoda
- Class: Insecta
- Order: Coleoptera
- Suborder: Polyphaga
- Infraorder: Cucujiformia
- Family: Cerambycidae
- Genus: Woytkowskia
- Species: W. gruberi

Binomial name
- Woytkowskia gruberi Martins & Galileo, 1992

Species of beetle

Woytkowskia gruberi is a species of beetle in the family Cerambycidae. It was described by Martins and Galileo in 1992. It is known from Costa Rica.
