= Woytkowskia travassosi =

Scientific classification
- Kingdom: Animalia
- Phylum: Arthropoda
- Class: Insecta
- Order: Coleoptera
- Suborder: Polyphaga
- Infraorder: Cucujiformia
- Family: Cerambycidae
- Genus: Woytkowskia
- Species: W. travassosi

Binomial name
- Woytkowskia travassosi Lane, 1971

Species of beetle

Woytkowskia travassosi is a species of beetle in the family Cerambycidae. It was described by Lane in 1971. It is known from Brazil.
