= Woytkowskia (beetle) =

Scientific classification
- Kingdom: Animalia
- Phylum: Arthropoda
- Class: Insecta
- Order: Coleoptera
- Suborder: Polyphaga
- Infraorder: Cucujiformia
- Family: Cerambycidae
- Subfamily: Lamiinae
- Tribe: Hemilophini
- Genus: Woytkowskia; Lane, 1966

Genus of beetles

Woytkowskia is a genus of longhorn beetles of the subfamily Lamiinae, containing the following species:

- Woytkowskia gruberi Martins & Galileo, 1992
- Woytkowskia scorpiona Lane, 1966
- Woytkowskia travassosi Lane, 1971
