= Essostruthella =

Scientific classification
- Kingdom: Animalia
- Phylum: Arthropoda
- Class: Insecta
- Order: Coleoptera
- Suborder: Polyphaga
- Infraorder: Cucujiformia
- Family: Cerambycidae
- Subfamily: Lamiinae
- Tribe: Hemilophini
- Genus: Essostruthella; Lane, 1972

Genus of beetles

Essostruthella is a genus of longhorn beetles of the subfamily Lamiinae, containing the following species:

- Essostruthella acatinga Martins & Galileo, 2004
- Essostruthella nevermanni Lane, 1972
- Essostruthella notaticollis (Lane, 1973)
