= Essostruthella acatinga =

Scientific classification
- Kingdom: Animalia
- Phylum: Arthropoda
- Class: Insecta
- Order: Coleoptera
- Suborder: Polyphaga
- Infraorder: Cucujiformia
- Family: Cerambycidae
- Genus: Essostruthella
- Species: E. acatinga

Binomial name
- Essostruthella acatinga Martins & Galileo, 2004

Species of beetle

Essostruthella acatinga is a species of beetle in the family Cerambycidae. It was described by Martins and Galileo in 2004. It is known from Colombia.
