= Essostruthella nevermanni =

Scientific classification
- Kingdom: Animalia
- Phylum: Arthropoda
- Class: Insecta
- Order: Coleoptera
- Suborder: Polyphaga
- Infraorder: Cucujiformia
- Family: Cerambycidae
- Genus: Essostruthella
- Species: E. nevermanni

Binomial name
- Essostruthella nevermanni Lane, 1972

Species of beetle

Essostruthella nevermanni is a species of beetle in the family Cerambycidae. It was described by Lane in 1972. It is known from Costa Rica.
