= Essostruthella notaticollis =

Scientific classification
- Kingdom: Animalia
- Phylum: Arthropoda
- Class: Insecta
- Order: Coleoptera
- Suborder: Polyphaga
- Infraorder: Cucujiformia
- Family: Cerambycidae
- Genus: Essostruthella
- Species: E. notaticollis

Binomial name
- Essostruthella notaticollis (Lane, 1973)

Species of beetle

Essostruthella notaticollis is a species of beetle in the family Cerambycidae. It was described by Lane in 1973. It is known from Panama and Costa Rica.
