= Tetamauara eximia =

Scientific classification
- Domain: Eukaryota
- Kingdom: Animalia
- Phylum: Arthropoda
- Class: Insecta
- Order: Coleoptera
- Suborder: Polyphaga
- Infraorder: Cucujiformia
- Family: Cerambycidae
- Genus: Tetamauara
- Species: T. eximia

Binomial name
- Tetamauara eximia (Bates, 1885)

Species of beetle

Tetamauara eximia is a species of beetle in the family Cerambycidae. It was described by Henry Walter Bates in 1885. It is known from Panama.
