= Tetamauara retifera =

Scientific classification
- Domain: Eukaryota
- Kingdom: Animalia
- Phylum: Arthropoda
- Class: Insecta
- Order: Coleoptera
- Suborder: Polyphaga
- Infraorder: Cucujiformia
- Family: Cerambycidae
- Genus: Tetamauara
- Species: T. retifera

Binomial name
- Tetamauara retifera (Waterhouse, 1880)

Species of beetle

Tetamauara retifera is a species of beetle in the family Cerambycidae. It was described by Waterhouse in 1880. It is known from Ecuador.
