= Tetamauara =

Scientific classification
- Domain: Eukaryota
- Kingdom: Animalia
- Phylum: Arthropoda
- Class: Insecta
- Order: Coleoptera
- Suborder: Polyphaga
- Infraorder: Cucujiformia
- Family: Cerambycidae
- Genus: Tetamauara

Genus of beetles

Tetamauara is a genus of longhorn beetles of the subfamily Lamiinae, containing the following species:

- Tetamauara eximia (Bates, 1885)
- Tetamauara retifera (Waterhouse, 1880)
- Tetamauara unicolor (Bates, 1885)
