= Piratininga mocoia =

Scientific classification
- Domain: Eukaryota
- Kingdom: Animalia
- Phylum: Arthropoda
- Class: Insecta
- Order: Coleoptera
- Suborder: Polyphaga
- Infraorder: Cucujiformia
- Family: Cerambycidae
- Subfamily: Lamiinae
- Tribe: Hemilophini
- Genus: Piratininga
- Species: P. mocoia

Binomial name
- Piratininga mocoia Galileo & Martins, 2007

Species of beetle

Piratininga mocoia is a species of beetle in the family Cerambycidae. It was described by Galileo and Martins in 2007. It is known from Bolivia.
