= Piratininga piranga =

Scientific classification
- Domain: Eukaryota
- Kingdom: Animalia
- Phylum: Arthropoda
- Class: Insecta
- Order: Coleoptera
- Suborder: Polyphaga
- Infraorder: Cucujiformia
- Family: Cerambycidae
- Subfamily: Lamiinae
- Tribe: Hemilophini
- Genus: Piratininga
- Species: P. piranga

Binomial name
- Piratininga piranga Galileo & Martins, 1992

Species of beetle

Piratininga piranga is a species of beetle in the family Cerambycidae. It was described by Galileo and Martins in 1992. It is known from Brazil.
