= Piratininga (beetle) =

Scientific classification
- Domain: Eukaryota
- Kingdom: Animalia
- Phylum: Arthropoda
- Class: Insecta
- Order: Coleoptera
- Suborder: Polyphaga
- Infraorder: Cucujiformia
- Family: Cerambycidae
- Subfamily: Lamiinae
- Tribe: Hemilophini
- Genus: Piratininga; Galileo & Martins, 1992

Genus of beetles

Piratininga is a genus of Long-Horned Beetles in the beetle family Cerambycidae. There are at least two described species in Piratininga, found in South America.

== Species ==
These two species belong to the genus Piratininga:

- Piratininga mocoia Galileo & Martins, 2007 (Bolivia)
- Piratininga piranga Galileo & Martins, 1992 (Brazil)
