= Poticuara ipiterpe =

Scientific classification
- Kingdom: Animalia
- Phylum: Arthropoda
- Clade: Pancrustacea
- Class: Insecta
- Order: Coleoptera
- Suborder: Polyphaga
- Infraorder: Cucujiformia
- Family: Cerambycidae
- Genus: Poticuara
- Species: P. ipiterpe

Binomial name
- Poticuara ipiterpe Martins & Galileo, 1991

Species of beetle

Poticuara ipiterpe is a species of beetle in the family Cerambycidae. It was described by Martins and Galileo in 1991. It lives in Costa Rica and Peru.
