= Poticuara exilis =

Scientific classification
- Domain: Eukaryota
- Kingdom: Animalia
- Phylum: Arthropoda
- Class: Insecta
- Order: Coleoptera
- Suborder: Polyphaga
- Infraorder: Cucujiformia
- Family: Cerambycidae
- Tribe: Hemilophini
- Genus: Poticuara
- Species: P. exilis

Binomial name
- Poticuara exilis (Bates, 1881)

Species of beetle

Poticuara exilis is a species of beetle in the family Cerambycidae. It was described by Henry Walter Bates in 1881. It is known from Bolivia.
