= Poticuara =

Scientific classification
- Domain: Eukaryota
- Kingdom: Animalia
- Phylum: Arthropoda
- Class: Insecta
- Order: Coleoptera
- Suborder: Polyphaga
- Infraorder: Cucujiformia
- Family: Cerambycidae
- Tribe: Hemilophini
- Genus: Poticuara

Genus of beetles

Poticuara is a genus of longhorn beetles of the subfamily Lamiinae, containing the following species:

- Poticuara exilis (Bates, 1881)
- Poticuara ipiterpe Martins & Galileo, 1991
