= Unaporanga =

Scientific classification
- Kingdom: Animalia
- Phylum: Arthropoda
- Class: Insecta
- Order: Coleoptera
- Suborder: Polyphaga
- Infraorder: Cucujiformia
- Family: Cerambycidae
- Subfamily: Lamiinae
- Tribe: Hemilophini
- Genus: Unaporanga; Martins & Galileo, 2007

Genus of beetles

Unaporanga is a genus of longhorn beetles of the subfamily Lamiinae, containing the following species:

- Unaporanga cincta Martins & Galileo, 2007
- Unaporanga lanceolata Martins & Galileo, 2007
