= Guayuriba =

Scientific classification
- Kingdom: Animalia
- Phylum: Arthropoda
- Class: Insecta
- Order: Coleoptera
- Suborder: Polyphaga
- Infraorder: Cucujiformia
- Family: Cerambycidae
- Subfamily: Lamiinae
- Tribe: Hemilophini
- Genus: Guayuriba; Lane, 1970

Genus of beetle

Guayuriba is a genus of beetles in the family Cerambycidae.

Species:

- Guayuriba bezarki Audureau & Demez, 2016
- Guayuriba dilaticeps (Bates, 1881)
