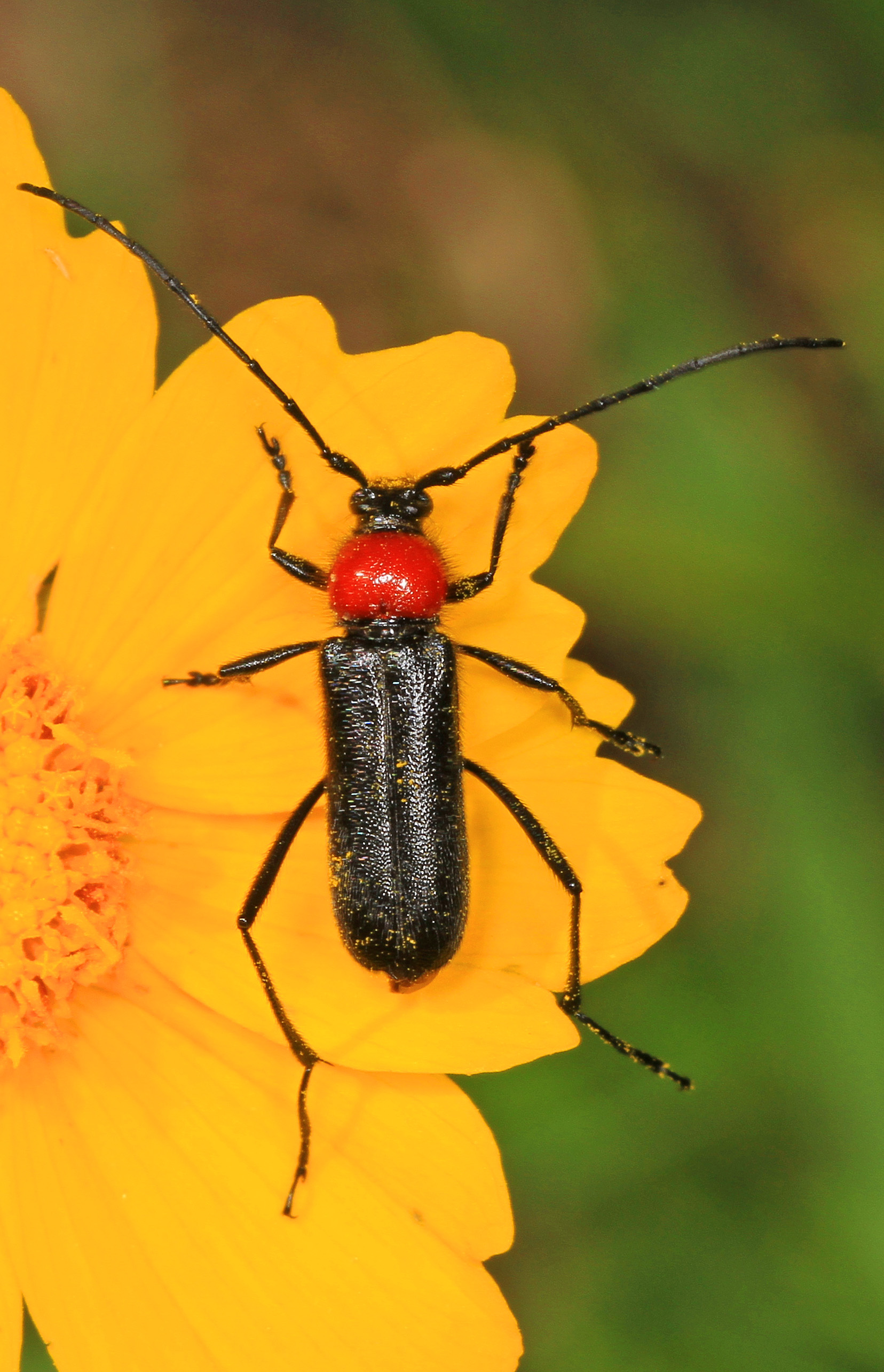
- Batyle ignicollis

Scientific classification
- Kingdom: Animalia
- Phylum: Arthropoda
- Clade: Pancrustacea
- Class: Insecta
- Order: Coleoptera
- Suborder: Polyphaga
- Infraorder: Cucujiformia
- Family: Cerambycidae
- Subfamily: Cerambycinae
- Tribe: Trachyderini; Dupont, 1836

Synonyms
- Dorcacerides Lacordaire, 1869; Megaderitae Thomson, 1860; Metopocoilitae Thomson, 1864; Poecilopeplides Lacordaire, 1869; Purpuricenitae Thomson, 1860; Stenaspides Lacordaire, 1869; Sternacanthitae Thomson, 1864; Tropidosomitae Thomson, 1864; Tyloses LeConte, 1873

= Trachyderini =

Tribe of beetles

Trachyderini is a tribe of long-horned beetles in the family Cerambycidae. There are at least 140 genera and 650 described species in Trachyderini.

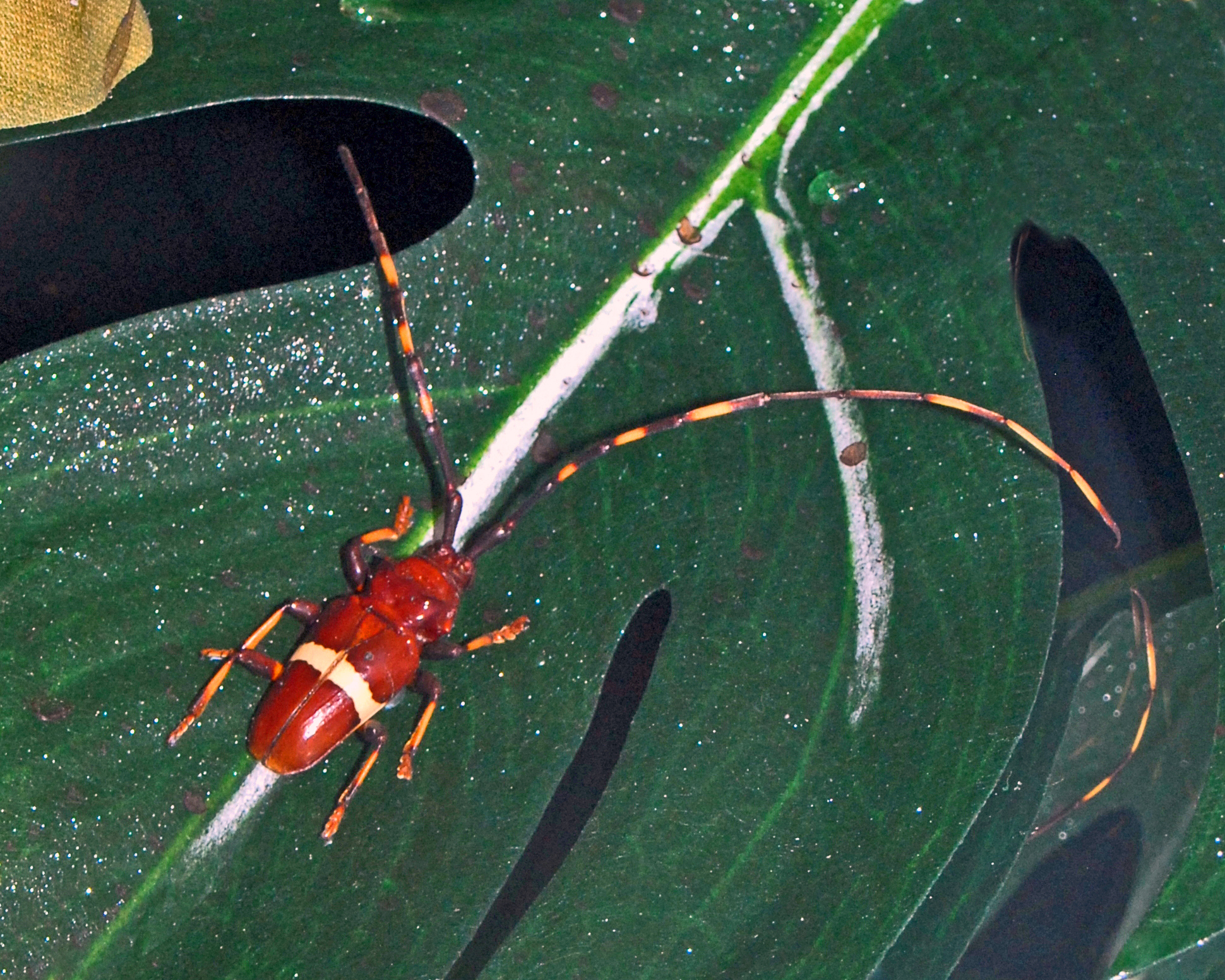
Trachyderes succinctus

== Selected genera ==
- Aegoidus
- Aethecerinus Fall & Cockerell, 1907
- Allopeplus
- Amannus LeConte, 1858
- Amphionthe
- Ancylocera Audinet-Serville, 1834
- Ancylosternus
- Andrachydes
- Andraegoidus
- Assycuera
- Athetesis
- Axestoleus
- Batyle Thomson, 1864
- Callancyla
- Callona Waterhouse, 1840
- Ceragenia
- Ceralocyna
- Cercoptera
- Cervilissa
- Charinotes
- Chemsakia
- Chemsakiella Monné, 2006
- Chevrolatella
- Chlorotherion
- Chydarteres
- Cosmocerus
- Crioprosopus Audinet-Serville, 1834
- Crossidius LeConte, 1851
- Cryptobias
- Ctenodes
- Cyphosterna
- Deltaspis Audinet-Serville, 1834
- Dendrobias Dupont, 1834
- Deretrachys
- Desmoderus
- Dicranoderes
- Dorcacerus
- Drychateres
- Elytroleptus Duges, 1879
- Entomosterna
- Eriocharis
- Eriphus
- Exallancyla
- Galissus
- Gambria
- Giesbertella
- Giesbertia
- Gonyacantha
- Gortonia
- Hoegea
- Hudepohlellus
- Ischnocnemis
- Lissonomimus
- Lissonoschema
- Lissonotypus
- Lophalia Casey, 1912
- Mannophorus LeConte, 1854
- Martinsellus
- Megaderus Dejean, 1821
- Megapurpuricenus Eya
- Metaleptus Bates, 1872
- Metopocoilus
- Micropelta
- Mimonneticus
- Molitones
- Monneellus
- Muscidora
- Neochrysoprasis
- Neocrossidius
- Neogalissus
- Neotaphos
- Neotaranomis
- Noguerana
- Nothoprodontia
- Oxymerus Dupont in Audinet-Serville, 1834
- Ozodera
- Palaeotrachyderes
- Parabatyle
- Paraethecerus
- Paragortonia
- Parathetesis
- Parevander Aurivillius, 1912
- Paroxoplus
- Parozodera
- Perarthrus LeConte, 1851
- Phaedinus
- Phimosia
- Phoenidnus
- Pilostenaspis Eya
- Placoschema Chemsak & Hovore, 2010
- Pleuromenus
- Plionoma Casey, 1912
- Poecilopeplus
- Polyschisis
- Prodontia
- Pseudodeltaspis
- Pseudoeriphus
- Pseudophimosia
- Pseudostenaspis
- Pteracantha
- Pteroplatidius
- Purpuricenus Dejean, 1821
- Rachidion
- Retrachydes
- Rhodoleptus Linsley, 1962
- Schizax LeConte, 1873
- Scythroleus
- Seabraellus
- Seabraia
- Seabriella
- Sphaenothecus Dupont, 1838
- Steinheilia
- Stenaspis Audinet-Serville, 1834
- Stenobatyle
- Sternacanthus
- Stiphilus
- Streptolabis
- Tamenes
- Trachelissa
- Trachyderes Dalman in Schoenherr, 1817
- Trachyderomorpha
- Tragidion Audinet-Serville, 1834
- Triacetelus
- Tuberorachidion
- Tylosis LeConte, 1850
- Unachlorus
- Weyrauchia
- Xylocaris
- Zalophia
- Zenochloris
- Zonotylus
