= Callistochroma =

Scientific classification
- Domain: Eukaryota
- Kingdom: Animalia
- Phylum: Arthropoda
- Class: Insecta
- Order: Coleoptera
- Suborder: Polyphaga
- Infraorder: Cucujiformia
- Family: Cerambycidae
- Subfamily: Cerambycinae
- Tribe: Trachyderini
- Genus: Callistochroma; Eya, 2015

Genus of beetles

Callistochroma is a genus of long-horned beetles in the family Cerambycidae. There are about seven described species in Callistochroma.

== Species ==
These seven species belong to the genus Callistochroma:

- Callistochroma cacica (Bates, 1885)
- Callistochroma chrysiptera Eya, 2015
- Callistochroma flavofasciata (Chemsak & Hovore, 2011)
- Callistochroma lampros (Bates, 1885)
- Callistochroma rutilans (Bates, 1869)
- Callistochroma viridipennis (Latreille, 1811)
- Callistochroma viridipurpurea Eya, 2015
