= Panchylissus =

Scientific classification
- Kingdom: Animalia
- Phylum: Arthropoda
- Class: Insecta
- Order: Coleoptera
- Suborder: Polyphaga
- Infraorder: Cucujiformia
- Family: Cerambycidae
- Tribe: Trachyderini
- Genus: Panchylissus

Genus of beetles

Panchylissus is a genus of beetles in the family Cerambycidae, containing the following species:

- Panchylissus cyaneipennis Waterhouse, 1880
- Panchylissus nigriventris Lane, 1965
