= Callistochroma viridipennis =

Scientific classification
- Kingdom: Animalia
- Phylum: Arthropoda
- Class: Insecta
- Order: Coleoptera
- Suborder: Polyphaga
- Infraorder: Cucujiformia
- Family: Cerambycidae
- Subfamily: Cerambycinae
- Tribe: Trachyderini
- Genus: Callistochroma
- Species: C. viridipennis

Binomial name
- Callistochroma viridipennis (Latreille, 1811)

Species of beetle

Callistochroma viridipennis is a species of long-horned beetle in the family Cerambycidae. It was described by Pierre André Latreille in 1811.
