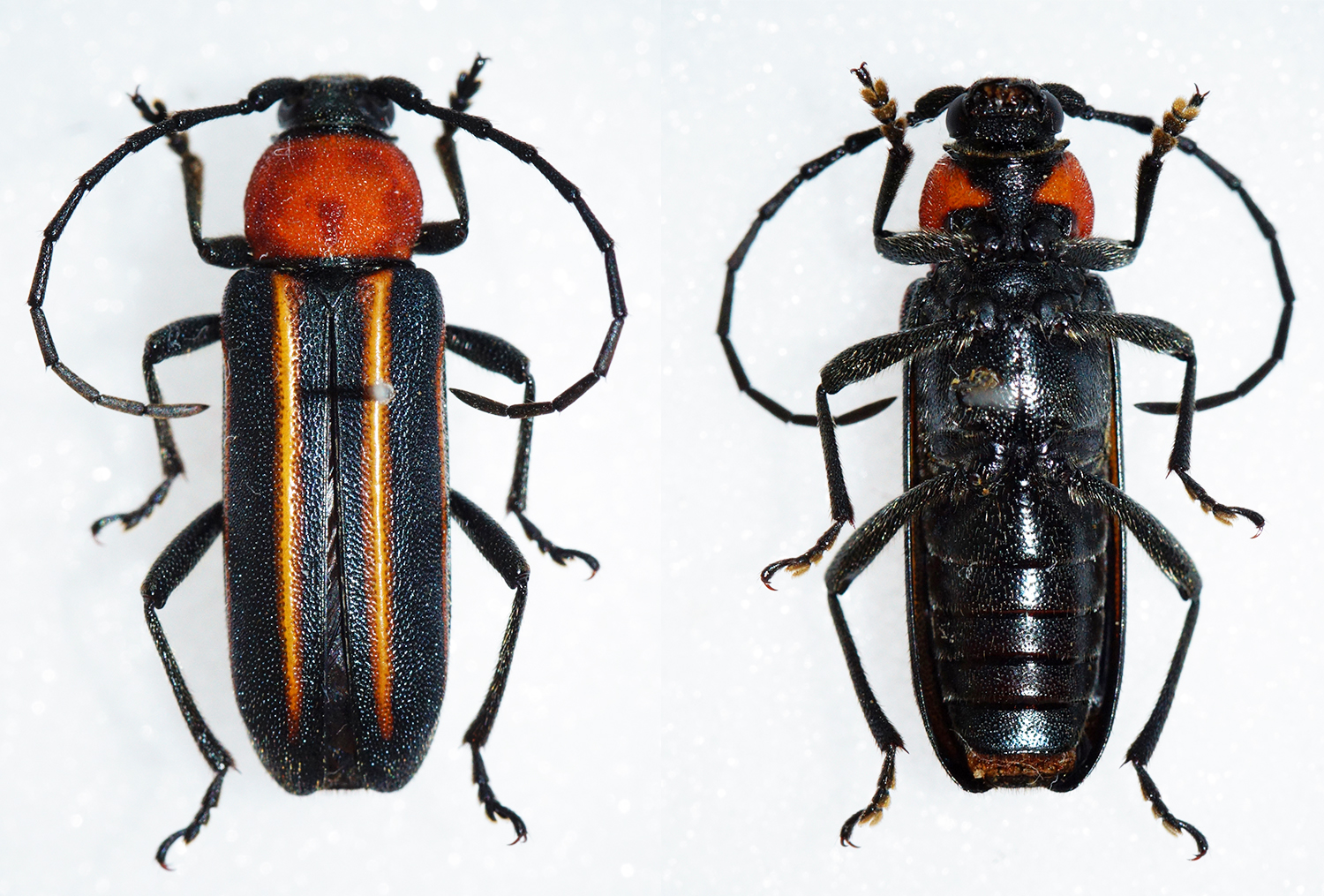
- Mannophorus laetus

Scientific classification
- Kingdom: Animalia
- Phylum: Arthropoda
- Class: Insecta
- Order: Coleoptera
- Suborder: Polyphaga
- Infraorder: Cucujiformia
- Family: Cerambycidae
- Subfamily: Cerambycinae
- Tribe: Trachyderini
- Genus: Mannophorus; LeConte, 1854

= Mannophorus =

Genus of beetles

Mannophorus is a genus of beetles in the family Cerambycidae, containing the following species:

- Mannophorus forreri Bates, 1885
- Mannophorus laetus LeConte, 1854
