= Ischnocnemis eyai =

Scientific classification
- Domain: Eukaryota
- Kingdom: Animalia
- Phylum: Arthropoda
- Class: Insecta
- Order: Coleoptera
- Suborder: Polyphaga
- Infraorder: Cucujiformia
- Family: Cerambycidae
- Genus: Ischnocnemis
- Species: I. eyai

Binomial name
- Ischnocnemis eyai Chemsak & Noguera, 1997

Species of beetle

Ischnocnemis eyai is a species of beetle in the family Cerambycidae. It was described by Chemsak & Noguera in 1997.
