= Paragortonia leptoforma =

Scientific classification
- Domain: Eukaryota
- Kingdom: Animalia
- Phylum: Arthropoda
- Class: Insecta
- Order: Coleoptera
- Suborder: Polyphaga
- Infraorder: Cucujiformia
- Family: Cerambycidae
- Genus: Paragortonia
- Species: P. leptoforma

Binomial name
- Paragortonia leptoforma Chemsak & Noguera, 2001

Species of beetle

Paragortonia leptoforma is a species of beetle in the family Cerambycidae. It was described by Chemsak & Noguera in 2001.
