= Sphaenothecus facetus =

Scientific classification
- Domain: Eukaryota
- Kingdom: Animalia
- Phylum: Arthropoda
- Class: Insecta
- Order: Coleoptera
- Suborder: Polyphaga
- Infraorder: Cucujiformia
- Family: Cerambycidae
- Genus: Sphaenothecus
- Species: S. facetus

Binomial name
- Sphaenothecus facetus Chemsak & Noguera, 1998

Species of beetle

Sphaenothecus facetus is a species of beetle in the family Cerambycidae. It was described by Chemsak & Noguera in 1998.
