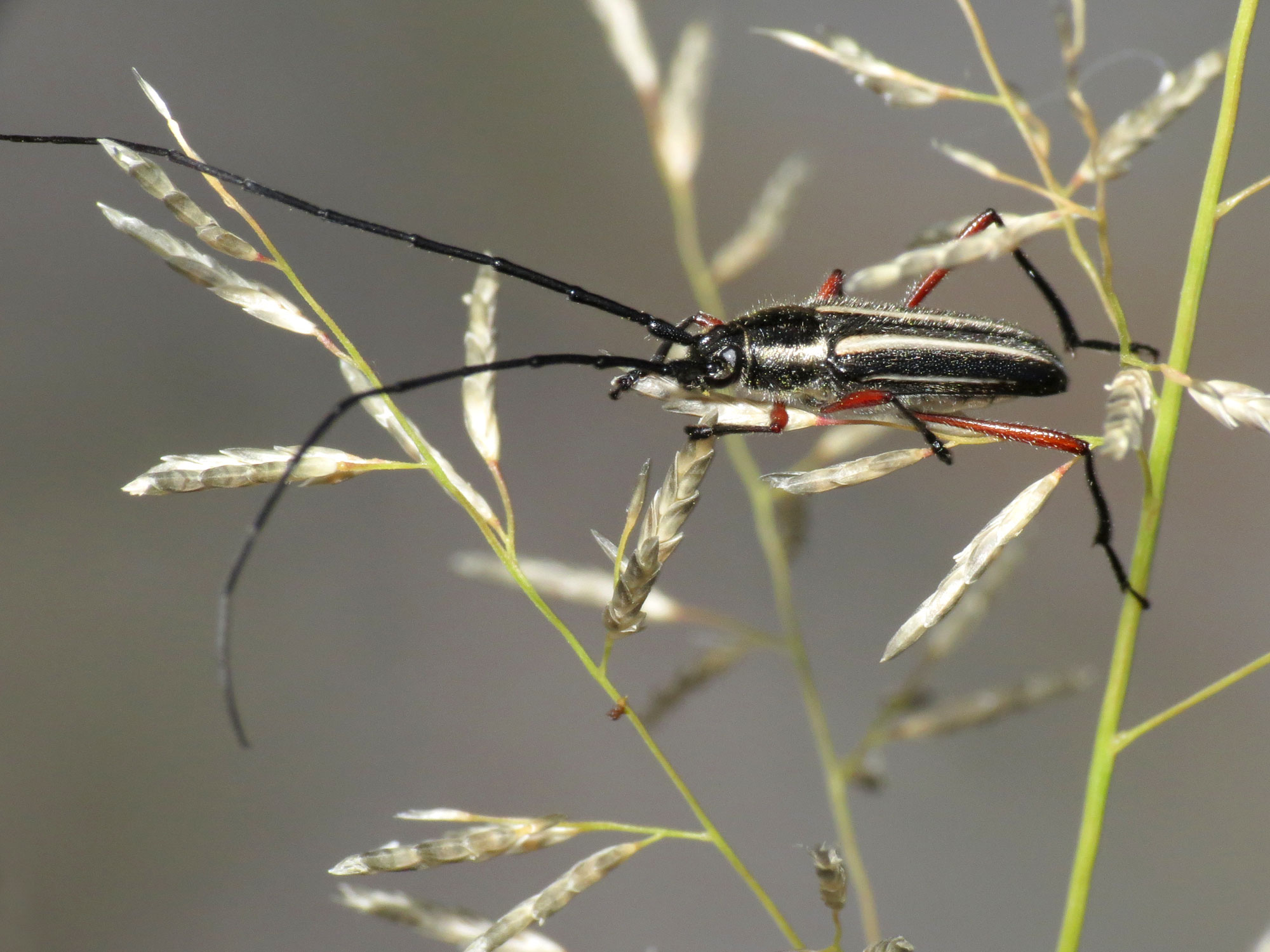
- Sphaenothecus bilineatus

Scientific classification
- Domain: Eukaryota
- Kingdom: Animalia
- Phylum: Arthropoda
- Class: Insecta
- Order: Coleoptera
- Suborder: Polyphaga
- Infraorder: Cucujiformia
- Family: Cerambycidae
- Subfamily: Cerambycinae
- Tribe: Trachyderini
- Subtribe: Trachyderina
- Genus: Sphaenothecus; Dupont, 1838

Synonyms
- Sphenothecus Dejean, 1835 (nomen nudum); Sphoenothecus Thomson, 1864 (lapsus calami); Taranomis Casey, 1912; Iscnocnemis LeConte 1873 (lapsus calami)

= Sphaenothecus =

Genus of beetles

Sphaenothecus is a genus of beetles in the family Cerambycidae, containing the following species:

- Sphaenothecus argenteus Bates, 1880
- Sphaenothecus bilineatus (Gory, 1831)
- Sphaenothecus facetus Chemsak & Noguera, 1998
- Sphaenothecus maccartyi Chemsak & Noguera, 1998
- Sphaenothecus picticornis Bates, 1880
- Sphaenothecus toledoi Chemsak & Noguera, 1998
- Sphaenothecus trilineatus Dupont, 1838
