= Plionoma basalis =

Scientific classification
- Domain: Eukaryota
- Kingdom: Animalia
- Phylum: Arthropoda
- Class: Insecta
- Order: Coleoptera
- Suborder: Polyphaga
- Infraorder: Cucujiformia
- Family: Cerambycidae
- Genus: Plionoma
- Species: P. basalis

Binomial name
- Plionoma basalis (Horn, 1894)

Species of beetle

Plionoma basalis is a species of beetle in the family Cerambycidae. It was described by Horn in 1894.
