= Perarthrus linsleyi =

Scientific classification
- Domain: Eukaryota
- Kingdom: Animalia
- Phylum: Arthropoda
- Class: Insecta
- Order: Coleoptera
- Suborder: Polyphaga
- Infraorder: Cucujiformia
- Family: Cerambycidae
- Genus: Perarthrus
- Species: P. linsleyi

Binomial name
- Perarthrus linsleyi (Knull, 1942)

Species of beetle

Perarthrus linsleyi is a species of beetle in the family Cerambycidae. It was described by Knull in 1942.
