= Ischnocnemis virescens =

Scientific classification
- Domain: Eukaryota
- Kingdom: Animalia
- Phylum: Arthropoda
- Class: Insecta
- Order: Coleoptera
- Suborder: Polyphaga
- Infraorder: Cucujiformia
- Family: Cerambycidae
- Genus: Ischnocnemis
- Species: I. virescens

Binomial name
- Ischnocnemis virescens (Eya, 2010)

Species of beetle

Ischnocnemis virescens is a species of beetle in the family Cerambycidae. It was described by Eya in 2010.
