= Paragortonia =

Scientific classification
- Domain: Eukaryota
- Kingdom: Animalia
- Phylum: Arthropoda
- Class: Insecta
- Order: Coleoptera
- Suborder: Polyphaga
- Infraorder: Cucujiformia
- Family: Cerambycidae
- Subfamily: Cerambycinae
- Tribe: Trachyderini
- Genus: Paragortonia; Chemsak & Noguera, 2001

Genus of beetles

Paragortonia is a genus of beetles in the family Cerambycidae, containing the following species:

- Paragortonia discoidea (Linsley, 1935)
- Paragortonia leptoforma Chemsak & Noguera, 2001
