= Chydarteres strigatus =

Scientific classification
- Domain: Eukaryota
- Kingdom: Animalia
- Phylum: Arthropoda
- Class: Insecta
- Order: Coleoptera
- Suborder: Polyphaga
- Infraorder: Cucujiformia
- Family: Cerambycidae
- Genus: Chydarteres
- Species: C. strigatus

Binomial name
- Chydarteres strigatus (Dupont, 1836)

Species of beetle

Chydarteres strigatus is a species of beetle in the family Cerambycidae. It was described by Dupont in 1836.
