= Chydarteres bicolor =

Scientific classification
- Kingdom: Animalia
- Phylum: Arthropoda
- Clade: Pancrustacea
- Class: Insecta
- Order: Coleoptera
- Suborder: Polyphaga
- Infraorder: Cucujiformia
- Family: Cerambycidae
- Genus: Chydarteres
- Species: C. bicolor

Binomial name
- Chydarteres bicolor (Fabricius, 1787)

Synonyms
- Cerambyx bicolor Voet, 1781 (Unav.); Cerambyx bicolor Fabricius, 1787

Species of beetle

Chydarteres bicolor is a species of beetle in the family Cerambycidae. It was described by Johan Christian Fabricius in 1787.
