= Parozodera chemsaki =

Scientific classification
- Domain: Eukaryota
- Kingdom: Animalia
- Phylum: Arthropoda
- Class: Insecta
- Order: Coleoptera
- Suborder: Polyphaga
- Infraorder: Cucujiformia
- Family: Cerambycidae
- Genus: Parozodera
- Species: P. chemsaki

Binomial name
- Parozodera chemsaki Huedepohl, 1985

Species of beetle

Parozodera chemsaki is a species of beetle in the family Cerambycidae. It was described by Huedepohl in 1985.
