= Panchylissus nigriventris =

Scientific classification
- Kingdom: Animalia
- Phylum: Arthropoda
- Class: Insecta
- Order: Coleoptera
- Suborder: Polyphaga
- Infraorder: Cucujiformia
- Family: Cerambycidae
- Genus: Panchylissus
- Species: P. nigriventris

Binomial name
- Panchylissus nigriventris Lane, 1965

Species of beetle

Panchylissus nigriventris is a species of beetle in the family Cerambycidae. It was described by Lane in 1965.
