= Perarthrus =

Scientific classification
- Kingdom: Animalia
- Phylum: Arthropoda
- Class: Insecta
- Order: Coleoptera
- Suborder: Polyphaga
- Infraorder: Cucujiformia
- Family: Cerambycidae
- Subfamily: Cerambycinae
- Tribe: Trachyderini
- Genus: Perarthrus; LeConte, 1851

Genus of beetles

Perarthrus is a genus of beetles in the family Cerambycidae, containing the following species:

- Perarthrus linsleyi (Knull, 1942)
- Perarthrus pallida (Schaeffer, 1905)
- Perarthrus vittatus LeConte, 1851
