= Parozodera farinosa =

Scientific classification
- Domain: Eukaryota
- Kingdom: Animalia
- Phylum: Arthropoda
- Class: Insecta
- Order: Coleoptera
- Suborder: Polyphaga
- Infraorder: Cucujiformia
- Family: Cerambycidae
- Genus: Parozodera
- Species: P. farinosa

Binomial name
- Parozodera farinosa (Burmeister, 1865)

Species of beetle

Parozodera farinosa is a species of beetle in the family Cerambycidae. It was described by Hermann Burmeister in 1865.
