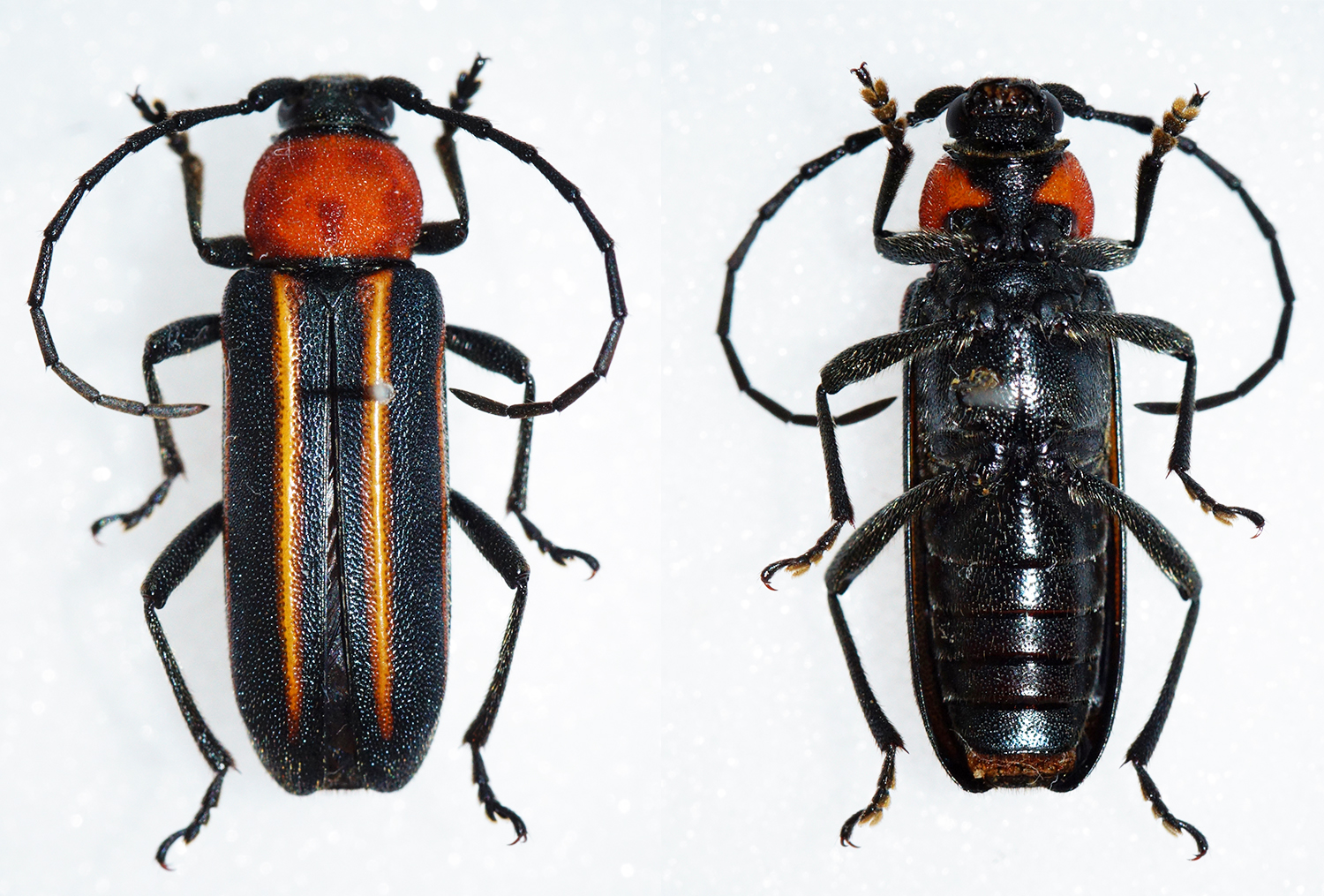

Scientific classification
- Kingdom: Animalia
- Phylum: Arthropoda
- Class: Insecta
- Order: Coleoptera
- Suborder: Polyphaga
- Infraorder: Cucujiformia
- Family: Cerambycidae
- Genus: Mannophorus
- Species: M. laetus

Binomial name
- Mannophorus laetus LeConte, 1854

= Mannophorus laetus =

Species of beetle

Mannophorus laetus is a species of beetle in the family Cerambycidae. It was described by John Lawrence LeConte in 1854.
