= Chydarteres octolineatus =

Scientific classification
- Domain: Eukaryota
- Kingdom: Animalia
- Phylum: Arthropoda
- Class: Insecta
- Order: Coleoptera
- Suborder: Polyphaga
- Infraorder: Cucujiformia
- Family: Cerambycidae
- Genus: Chydarteres
- Species: C. octolineatus

Binomial name
- Chydarteres octolineatus (Thunberg, 1822)

Species of beetle

Chydarteres octolineatus is a species of beetle in the family Cerambycidae. It was described by Thunberg in 1822.
