= Callistochroma cacica =

Scientific classification
- Domain: Eukaryota
- Kingdom: Animalia
- Phylum: Arthropoda
- Class: Insecta
- Order: Coleoptera
- Suborder: Polyphaga
- Infraorder: Cucujiformia
- Family: Cerambycidae
- Genus: Callistochroma
- Species: C. cacica

Binomial name
- Callistochroma cacica (Bates, 1885)

Species of beetle

Callistochroma cacica is a species of long-horned beetle in the family Cerambycidae.
