= Stiphilus =

Scientific classification
- Domain: Eukaryota
- Kingdom: Animalia
- Phylum: Arthropoda
- Class: Insecta
- Order: Coleoptera
- Suborder: Polyphaga
- Infraorder: Cucujiformia
- Family: Cerambycidae
- Subfamily: Cerambycinae
- Tribe: Trachyderini
- Subtribe: Trachyderina
- Genus: Stiphilus; Buquet, 1840
- Species: S. quadripunctatus

Binomial name
- Stiphilus quadripunctatus Buquet, 1840

Genus of beetles

Stiphilus is a genus of longhorned beetles in the family Cerambycidae. This genus has a single species, Stiphilus quadripunctatus, found in Brazil.
