= Ischnocnemis =

Scientific classification
- Domain: Eukaryota
- Kingdom: Animalia
- Phylum: Arthropoda
- Class: Insecta
- Order: Coleoptera
- Suborder: Polyphaga
- Infraorder: Cucujiformia
- Family: Cerambycidae
- Subfamily: Cerambycinae
- Tribe: Trachyderini
- Genus: Ischnocnemis; Thomson, 1864

Genus of beetles

Ischnocnemis is a genus of beetles in the family Cerambycidae, containing the following species:

- Ischnocnemis caerulescens Bates, 1885
- Ischnocnemis costipennis Thomson, 1864
- Ischnocnemis cribellatus (Bates, 1892)
- Ischnocnemis cyaneus Bates, 1892
- Ischnocnemis eyai Chemsak & Noguera, 1997
- Ischnocnemis glabra Chemsak & Linsley, 1988
- Ischnocnemis luteicollis (Bates, 1885)
- Ischnocnemis minor Bates, 1880
- Ischnocnemis sexualis Bates, 1885
- Ischnocnemis similis Chemsak & Noguera, 1997
- Ischnocnemis skillmani Chemsak & Hovore, in Eya, 2010
- Ischnocnemis subviridis Chemsak & Hovore, in Eya, 2010
- Ischnocnemis virescens Eya, 2010
