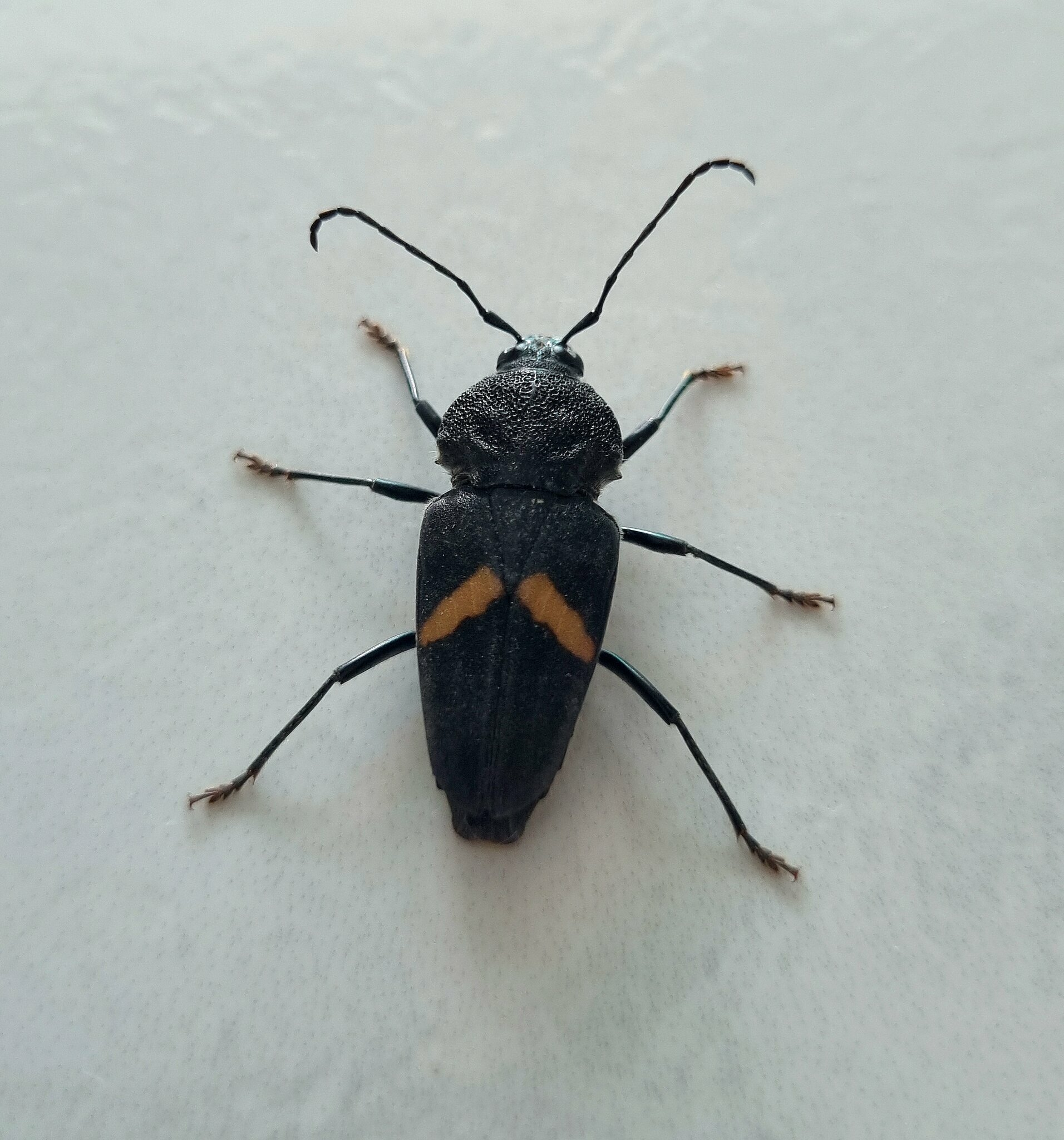
- M. stigma from Colombia

Scientific classification
- Kingdom: Animalia
- Phylum: Arthropoda
- Class: Insecta
- Order: Coleoptera
- Suborder: Polyphaga
- Infraorder: Cucujiformia
- Family: Cerambycidae
- Genus: Megaderus
- Species: M. stigma

Binomial name
- Megaderus stigma (Linné, 1758)

Synonyms
- Cerambyx stigma Linné, 1758; Megaderus latifasciatus Bates, 1870; Megaderus stigma ab. bimaculatus Tippmann, 1960; Megaderus stigma ab. interruptefasciatus Tippmann, 1960

= Megaderus stigma =

Species of beetle

Megaderus stigma is a species of long-horned beetle in the family Cerambycidae. It is found in Nicaragua, Costa Rica, Panama, Trinidad & Tobago, Colombia, Venezuela, Guyana, Suriname, French Guiana, Brazil (Paraíba, Pernambuco, Alagoas, Bahia, Mato Grosso, Minas Gerais, Espírito Santo, Rio de Janeiro, São Paulo, Paraná, Santa Catarina, Rio Grande do Sul), Peru, Bolivia, Paraguay, Argentina and Uruguay.

This species was described by Linnaeus. He described it as: Cerambyx sub-short, roundish, coarsely punctate, body dark, elytra smooth: with white macula. Habitat in America. Rolander. Totally black. thorax hemispherical, sub-margined, abundantly coarsely punctate, posteriorly excavated close to lateral tooth. Scutellum smooth, longer in the other species. Elytra smooth, black, on each side of scutellum with white line outward oblique.
