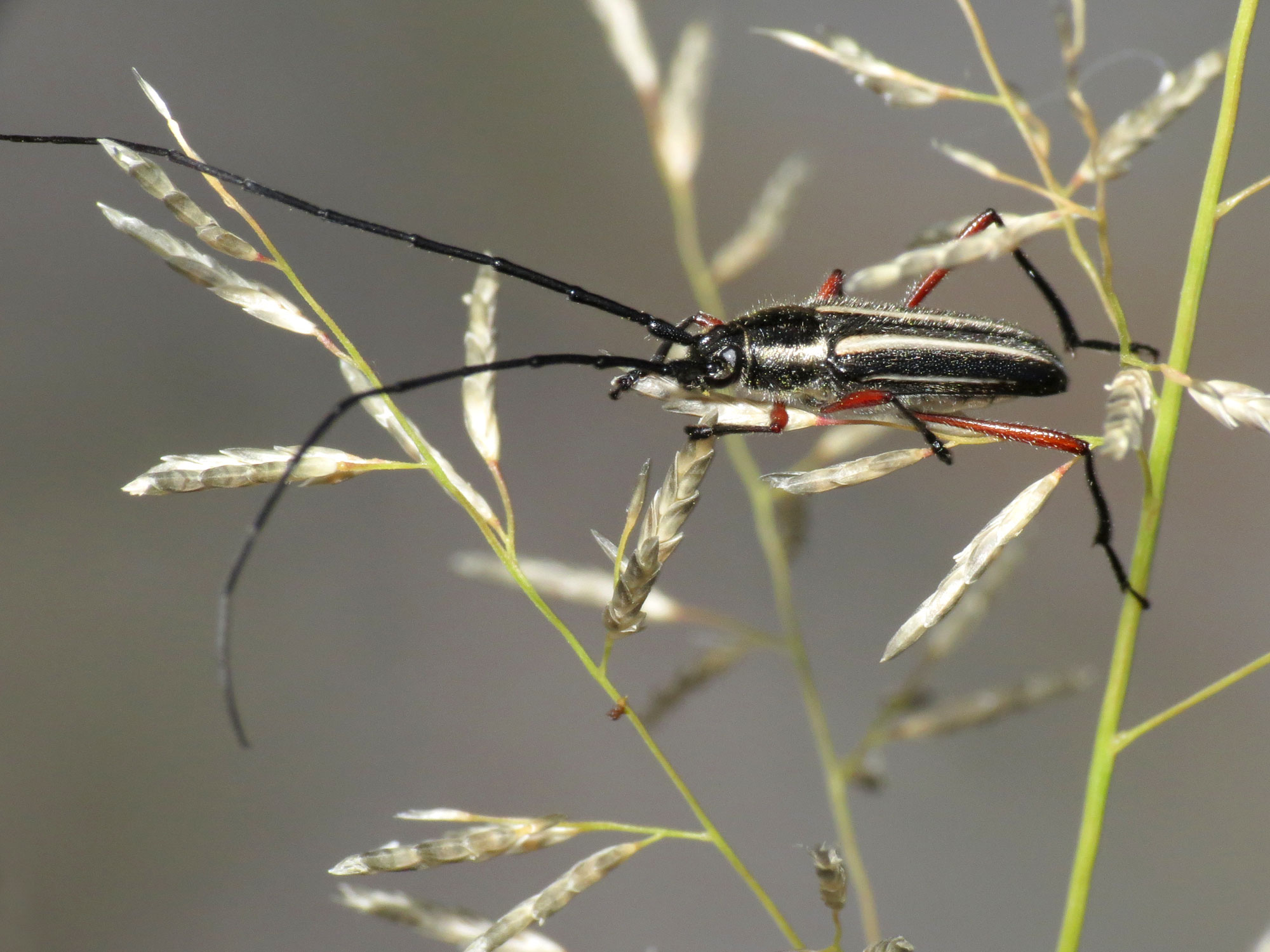

Scientific classification
- Domain: Eukaryota
- Kingdom: Animalia
- Phylum: Arthropoda
- Class: Insecta
- Order: Coleoptera
- Suborder: Polyphaga
- Infraorder: Cucujiformia
- Family: Cerambycidae
- Genus: Sphaenothecus
- Species: S. bilineatus

Binomial name
- Sphaenothecus bilineatus (Gory, 1831)

Synonyms
- Sphaenothecus bivittatus

= Sphaenothecus bilineatus =

Species of beetle

Sphaenothecus bilineatus, the double-banded bycid, is a species of long-horned beetle in the family Cerambycidae.
