= Ischnocnemis caerulescens =

Scientific classification
- Domain: Eukaryota
- Kingdom: Animalia
- Phylum: Arthropoda
- Class: Insecta
- Order: Coleoptera
- Suborder: Polyphaga
- Infraorder: Cucujiformia
- Family: Cerambycidae
- Genus: Ischnocnemis
- Species: I. caerulescens

Binomial name
- Ischnocnemis caerulescens Bates, 1885

Species of beetle

Ischnocnemis caerulescens is a species of beetle in the family Cerambycidae. It was described by Bates in 1885.
