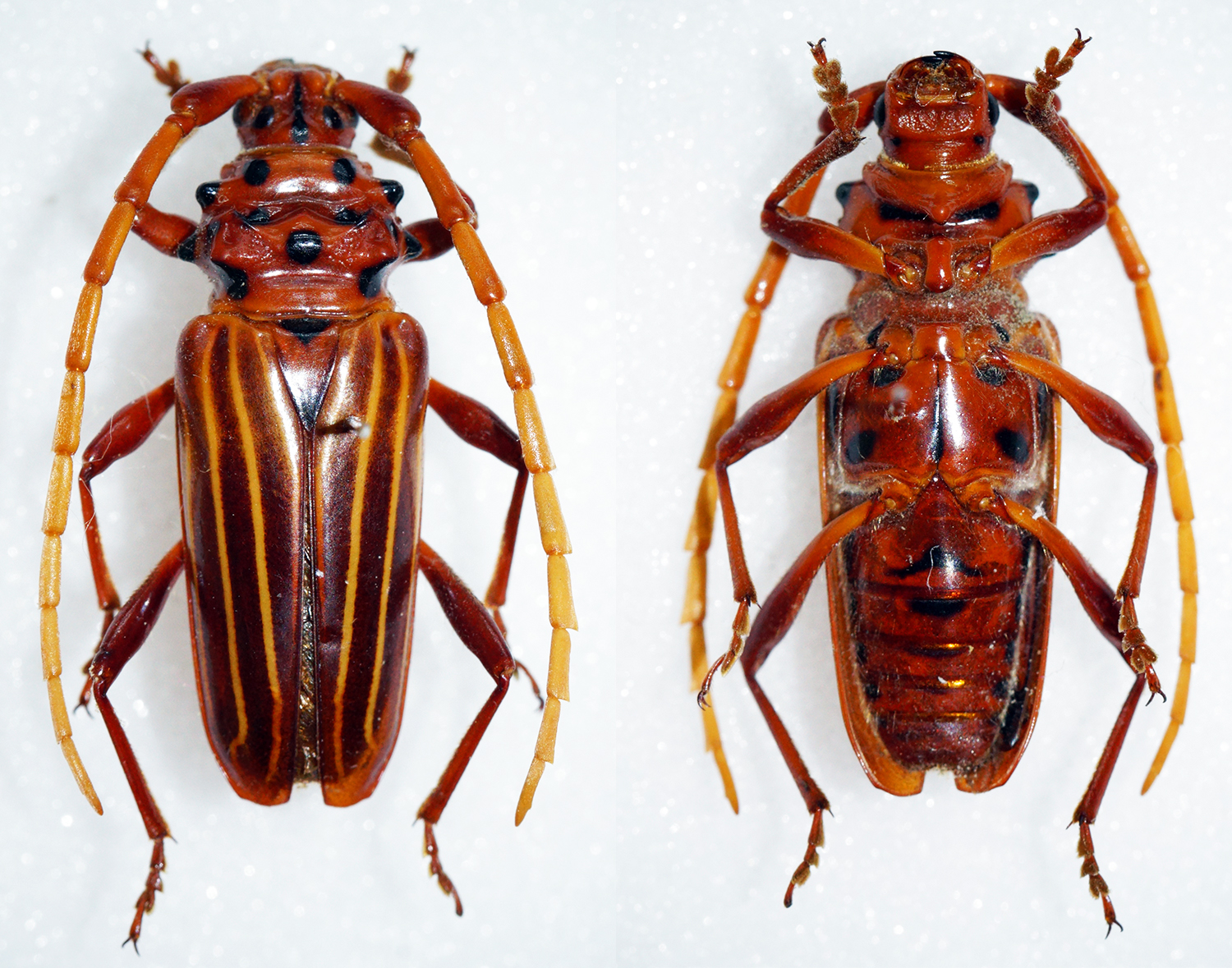

Scientific classification
- Kingdom: Animalia
- Phylum: Arthropoda
- Clade: Pancrustacea
- Class: Insecta
- Order: Coleoptera
- Suborder: Polyphaga
- Infraorder: Cucujiformia
- Family: Cerambycidae
- Genus: Chydarteres
- Species: C. striatus

Binomial name
- Chydarteres striatus (Fabricius, 1787)

Synonyms
- Ceramryx [sic] striatus Fabricius, 1787 (preocc., but see text); Cerambyx strigosus Gmelin, 1790; Trachyderes lineolatus Dupont, 1836; Trachyderes proximus Dupont, 1836; Trachyderes striatus v. lineolatus Gemminger & Harold, 1872; Trachyderes striatus v. proximus Gemminger & Harold, 1872

= Chydarteres striatus =

Species of beetle

Chydarteres striatus is a species of beetle in the family Cerambycidae. It was described by Johan Christian Fabricius in 1787, and while his name was preoccupied, it is treated as valid following ICZN Article 23.9.5.
