= Plionoma suturalis =

Scientific classification
- Domain: Eukaryota
- Kingdom: Animalia
- Phylum: Arthropoda
- Class: Insecta
- Order: Coleoptera
- Suborder: Polyphaga
- Infraorder: Cucujiformia
- Family: Cerambycidae
- Genus: Plionoma
- Species: P. suturalis

Binomial name
- Plionoma suturalis (LeConte, 1858)

Species of beetle

Plionoma suturalis is a species of beetle in the family Cerambycidae. It was described by John Lawrence LeConte in 1858.
