= Plionoma rubens =

Scientific classification
- Domain: Eukaryota
- Kingdom: Animalia
- Phylum: Arthropoda
- Class: Insecta
- Order: Coleoptera
- Suborder: Polyphaga
- Infraorder: Cucujiformia
- Family: Cerambycidae
- Genus: Plionoma
- Species: P. rubens

Binomial name
- Plionoma rubens (Casey, 1891)

Species of beetle

Plionoma rubens is a species of beetle in the family Cerambycidae. It was described by Casey in 1891.
