= Megaderus bifasciatus =

Scientific classification
- Domain: Eukaryota
- Kingdom: Animalia
- Phylum: Arthropoda
- Class: Insecta
- Order: Coleoptera
- Suborder: Polyphaga
- Infraorder: Cucujiformia
- Family: Cerambycidae
- Genus: Megaderus
- Species: M. bifasciatus

Binomial name
- Megaderus bifasciatus Dupont, 1836

Synonyms
- Megaderus corallifer Newman, 1840

Species of beetle

Megaderus bifasciatus is a species of long-horned beetle in the family Cerambycidae. It is found in Central America and North America, where it has been recorded from the United States (Texas and southern Arizona), Mexico (Guanajuato, Guerrero, Jalisco, México, Morelos), Guatemala and Honduras.
