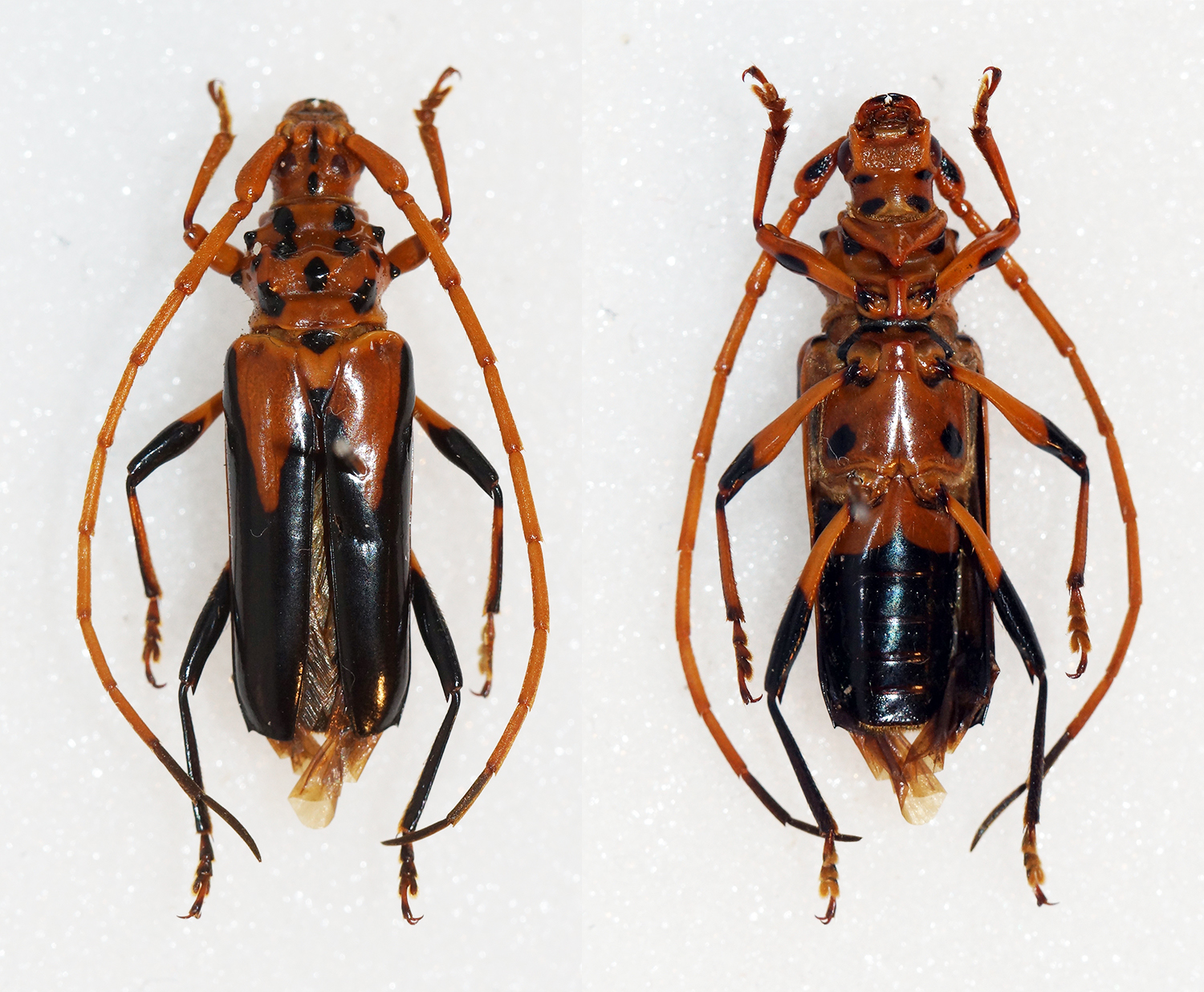
- Chydarteres dimidiatus

Scientific classification
- Domain: Eukaryota
- Kingdom: Animalia
- Phylum: Arthropoda
- Class: Insecta
- Order: Coleoptera
- Suborder: Polyphaga
- Infraorder: Cucujiformia
- Family: Cerambycidae
- Subfamily: Cerambycinae
- Tribe: Trachyderini
- Genus: Chydarteres; Hüdepohl, 1985

= Chydarteres =

Genus of beetles

Chydarteres is a genus of beetles in the family Cerambycidae, containing the following species:

- Chydarteres bicolor (Fabricius, 1787)
- Chydarteres costatus (Aurivillius, 1908)
- Chydarteres dimidiatus (Fabricius, 1787)
- Chydarteres formosus Galileo & Martins, 2010
- Chydarteres octolineatus (Thunberg, 1822)
- Chydarteres striatellus Huedepohl, 1985
- Chydarteres striatus (Fabricius, 1787)
- Chydarteres strigatus (Dupont, 1836)
