= Aegoidus =

Scientific classification
- Domain: Eukaryota
- Kingdom: Animalia
- Phylum: Arthropoda
- Class: Insecta
- Order: Coleoptera
- Suborder: Polyphaga
- Infraorder: Cucujiformia
- Family: Cerambycidae
- Subfamily: Cerambycinae
- Tribe: Trachyderini
- Genus: Aegoidus; Buquet, 1838

Genus of beetles

Aegoidus is a genus of beetles in the family Cerambycidae, containing the following species:

- Aegoidus calligrammus Bates, 1885
- Aegoidus debauvei (Guérin-Méneville, 1838)
- Aegoidus earlii Guérin-Méneville, 1840
- Aegoidus pacificus Tippmann, 1960
- Aegoidus peruvianus Buquet, 1838
- Aegoidus weyrauchi Tippmann, 1953
