= Parozodera =

Scientific classification
- Domain: Eukaryota
- Kingdom: Animalia
- Phylum: Arthropoda
- Class: Insecta
- Order: Coleoptera
- Suborder: Polyphaga
- Infraorder: Cucujiformia
- Family: Cerambycidae
- Subfamily: Cerambycinae
- Tribe: Trachyderini
- Genus: Parozodera; Bruch, 1940

Genus of beetles

Parozodera is a genus of beetles in the family Cerambycidae, containing the following species:

- Parozodera chemsaki Huedepohl, 1985
- Parozodera farinosa (Burmeister, 1865)
