= Ischnocnemis similis =

Scientific classification
- Domain: Eukaryota
- Kingdom: Animalia
- Phylum: Arthropoda
- Class: Insecta
- Order: Coleoptera
- Suborder: Polyphaga
- Infraorder: Cucujiformia
- Family: Cerambycidae
- Genus: Ischnocnemis
- Species: I. similis

Binomial name
- Ischnocnemis similis (Chemsak & Noguera, 1997)

Species of beetle

Ischnocnemis similis is a species of beetle in the family Cerambycidae. It was described by Chemsak & Noguera in 1997.
