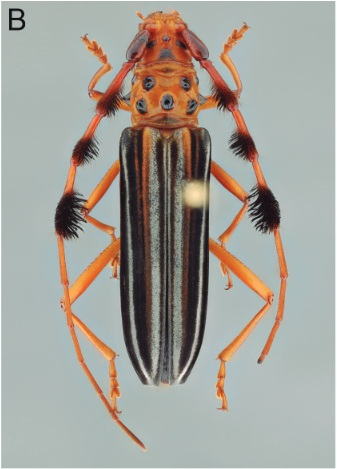

Scientific classification
- Kingdom: Animalia
- Phylum: Arthropoda
- Clade: Pancrustacea
- Class: Insecta
- Order: Coleoptera
- Suborder: Polyphaga
- Infraorder: Cucujiformia
- Family: Cerambycidae
- Subfamily: Cerambycinae
- Tribe: Trachyderini
- Genus: Cosmocerus; Guérin-Méneville, 1844
- Species: C. strigosus

Binomial name
- Cosmocerus strigosus Guérin-Méneville, 1844

= Cosmocerus =

Genus of beetles

Cosmocerus strigosus is a species of beetle in the family Cerambycidae, the only species in the genus Cosmocerus. It is found in Brazil (Minas Gerais, Espirito Santo, Rio de Janeiro, São Paulo, Paraná, Santa Catarina, Rio Grande do Sul) and Argentina.
