= Streptolabis =

Scientific classification
- Domain: Eukaryota
- Kingdom: Animalia
- Phylum: Arthropoda
- Class: Insecta
- Order: Coleoptera
- Suborder: Polyphaga
- Infraorder: Cucujiformia
- Family: Cerambycidae
- Subfamily: Cerambycinae
- Tribe: Trachyderini
- Subtribe: Trachyderina
- Genus: Streptolabis; Bates, 1867
- Species: S. hispoides

Binomial name
- Streptolabis hispoides Bates, 1867

Genus of beetles

Streptolabis is a genus of longhorn beetles in the family Cerambycidae. This genus has a single species, Streptolabis hispoides, found in Brazil, Ecuador, Bolivia, and Peru.
