= Ischnocnemis luteicollis =

Scientific classification
- Domain: Eukaryota
- Kingdom: Animalia
- Phylum: Arthropoda
- Class: Insecta
- Order: Coleoptera
- Suborder: Polyphaga
- Infraorder: Cucujiformia
- Family: Cerambycidae
- Genus: Ischnocnemis
- Species: I. luteicollis

Binomial name
- Ischnocnemis luteicollis (Bates, 1885)

Species of beetle

Ischnocnemis luteicollis is a species of beetle in the family Cerambycidae. It was described by Henry Walter Bates in 1885.
