= Panchylissus cyaneipennis =

Scientific classification
- Kingdom: Animalia
- Phylum: Arthropoda
- Class: Insecta
- Order: Coleoptera
- Suborder: Polyphaga
- Infraorder: Cucujiformia
- Family: Cerambycidae
- Genus: Panchylissus
- Species: P. cyaneipennis

Binomial name
- Panchylissus cyaneipennis Waterhouse, 1880

Species of beetle

Panchylissus cyaneipennis is a species of beetle in the family Cerambycidae. It was described by Waterhouse in 1880.
