= Sphaenothecus picticornis =

Scientific classification
- Kingdom: Animalia
- Phylum: Arthropoda
- Clade: Pancrustacea
- Class: Insecta
- Order: Coleoptera
- Suborder: Polyphaga
- Infraorder: Cucujiformia
- Family: Cerambycidae
- Genus: Sphaenothecus
- Species: S. picticornis

Binomial name
- Sphaenothecus picticornis Bates, 1880

Species of beetle

Sphaenothecus picticornis is a species of beetle in the family Cerambycidae. It was first described by Henry Walter Bates in 1880.
