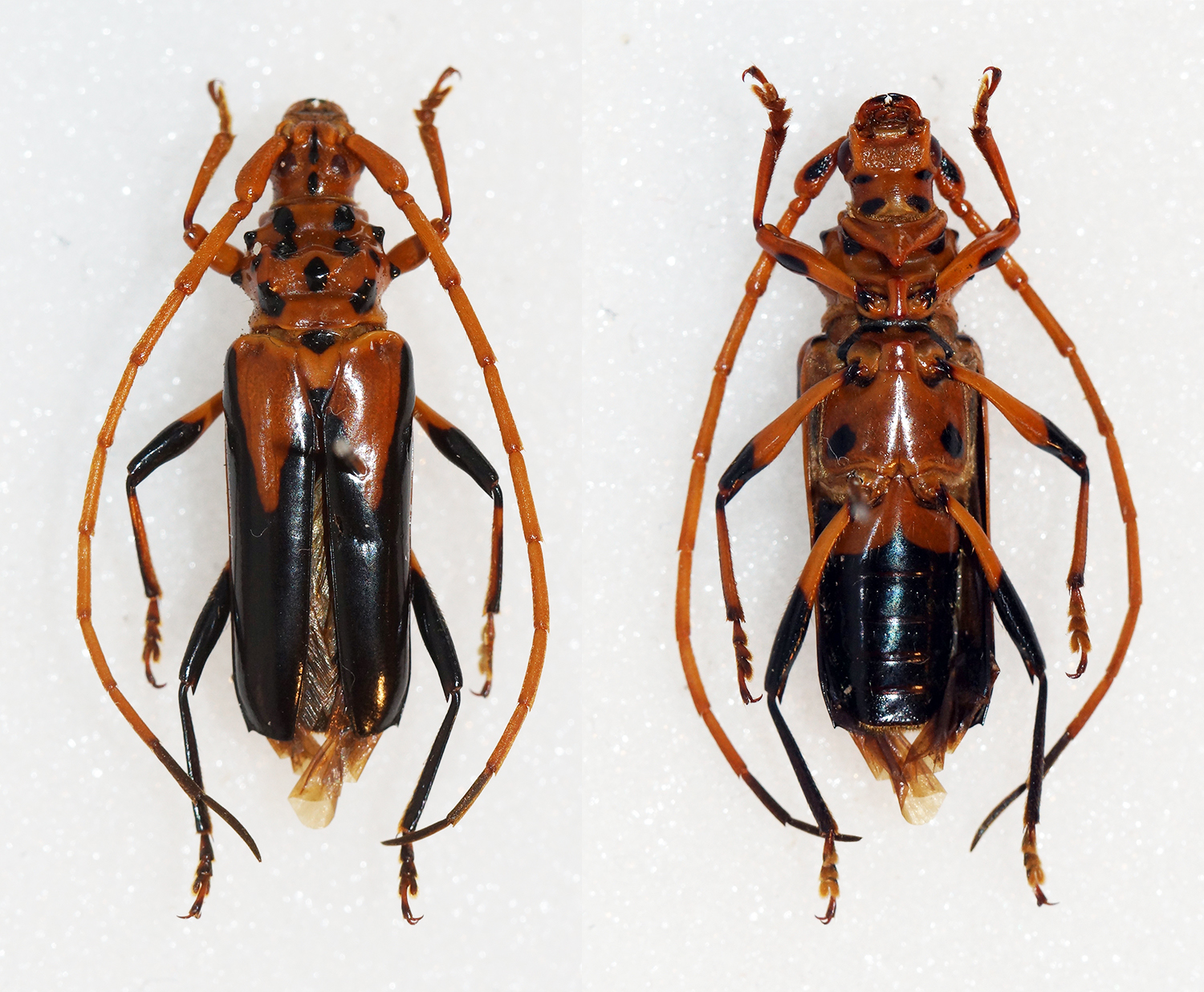

Scientific classification
- Kingdom: Animalia
- Phylum: Arthropoda
- Clade: Pancrustacea
- Class: Insecta
- Order: Coleoptera
- Suborder: Polyphaga
- Infraorder: Cucujiformia
- Family: Cerambycidae
- Genus: Chydarteres
- Species: C. dimidiatus

Binomial name
- Chydarteres dimidiatus (Fabricius, 1787)

Synonyms
- Cerambyx dimidiatus Fabricius, 1787; Trachyderes scapularis Dupont, 1836; Trachyderes conformis Dupont, 1836; Criptobias ocellatus Dohrn, 1879

= Chydarteres dimidiatus =

Species of beetle

Chydarteres dimidiatus is a species of beetle in the family Cerambycidae. It was described by Johan Christian Fabricius in 1787. It is found in Colombia, Venezuela, Bolivia, French Guiana, Brazil (Amazonas, Mato Grosso, Goiás, Distrito Federal, Piauí, Bahia, Minas Gerais, Espirito Santo, Rio de Janeiro, São Paulo, Paraná, Santa Catarina, Rio Grande do Sul), Paraguay, Argentina and Uruguay.
