= Plionoma =

Scientific classification
- Kingdom: Animalia
- Phylum: Arthropoda
- Class: Insecta
- Order: Coleoptera
- Suborder: Polyphaga
- Infraorder: Cucujiformia
- Family: Cerambycidae
- Subfamily: Cerambycinae
- Tribe: Trachyderini
- Genus: Plionoma; Casey, 1912

Genus of beetles

Plionoma is a genus of beetles in the family Cerambycidae, containing the following species:

- Plionoma basalis (Horn, 1894)
- Plionoma rubens (Casey, 1891)
- Plionoma suturalis (LeConte, 1858)
