= Aegoidus pacificus =

Scientific classification
- Domain: Eukaryota
- Kingdom: Animalia
- Phylum: Arthropoda
- Class: Insecta
- Order: Coleoptera
- Suborder: Polyphaga
- Infraorder: Cucujiformia
- Family: Cerambycidae
- Genus: Aegoidus
- Species: A. pacificus

Binomial name
- Aegoidus pacificus Tippmann, 1960

Species of beetle

Aegoidus pacificus is a species of beetle in the family Cerambycidae. It was described by Tippmann in 1960.
