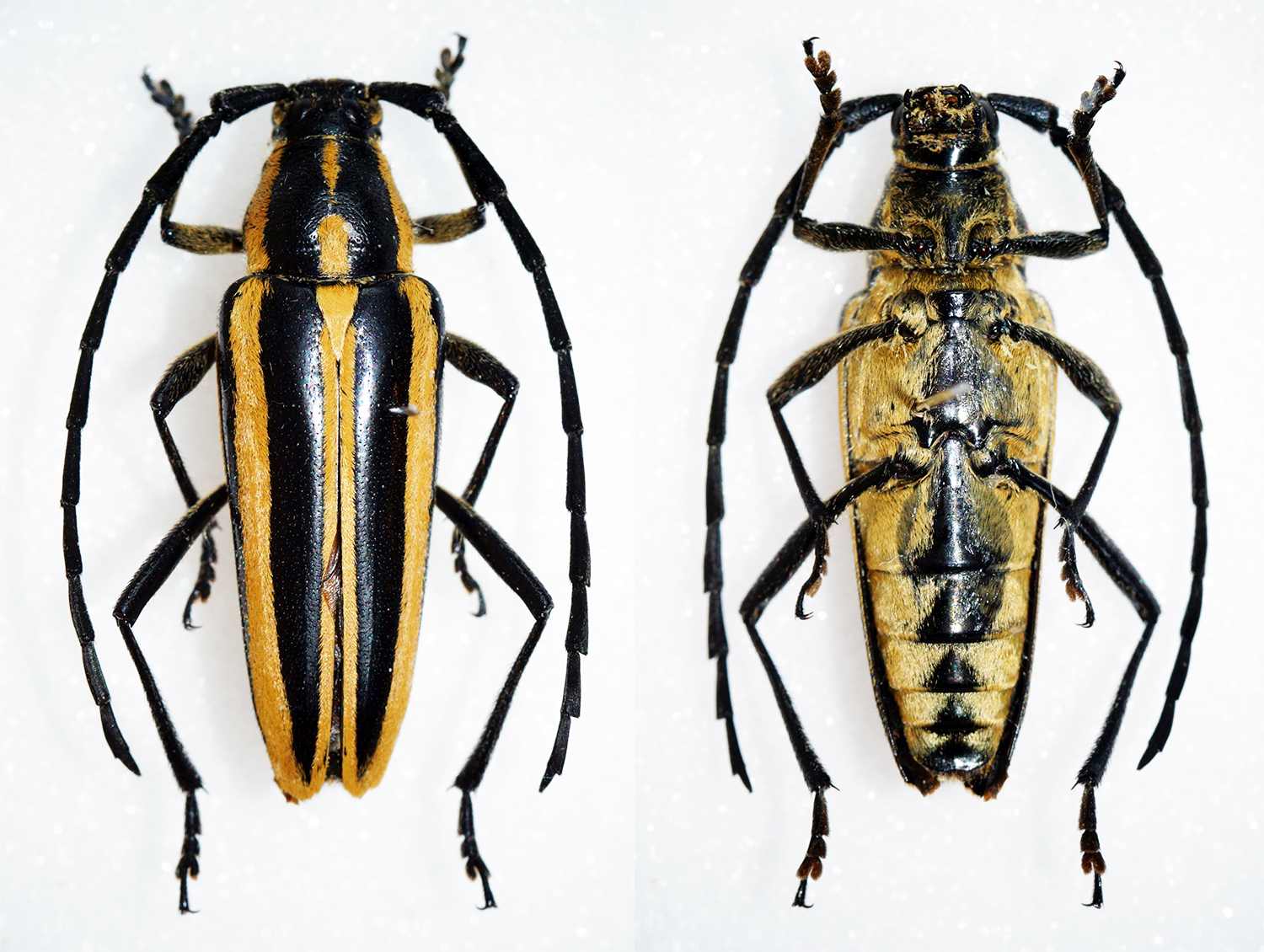

Scientific classification
- Domain: Eukaryota
- Kingdom: Animalia
- Phylum: Arthropoda
- Class: Insecta
- Order: Coleoptera
- Suborder: Polyphaga
- Infraorder: Cucujiformia
- Family: Cerambycidae
- Genus: Sphaenothecus
- Species: S. trilineatus

Binomial name
- Sphaenothecus trilineatus Dupont, 1838

= Sphaenothecus trilineatus =

Species of beetle

Sphaenothecus trilineatus is a species of beetle in the family Cerambycidae. It was described by Dupont in 1838.
