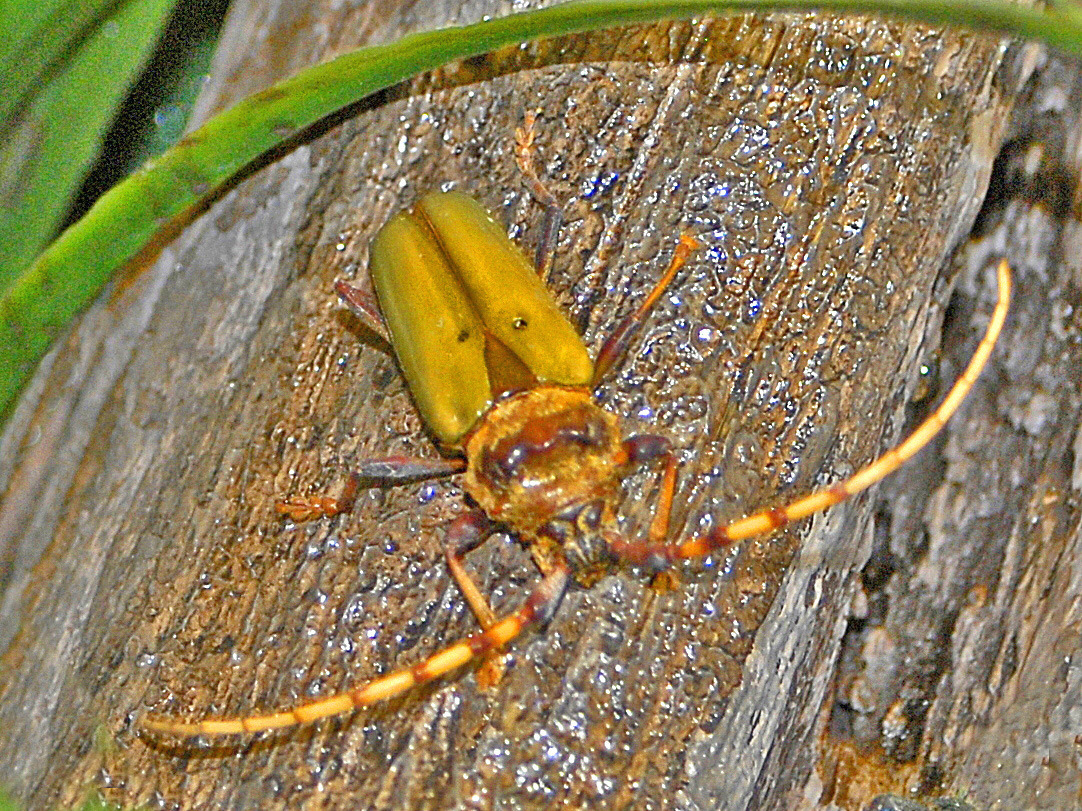

Scientific classification
- Kingdom: Animalia
- Phylum: Arthropoda
- Clade: Pancrustacea
- Class: Insecta
- Order: Coleoptera
- Suborder: Polyphaga
- Infraorder: Cucujiformia
- Family: Cerambycidae
- Subfamily: Cerambycinae
- Tribe: Trachyderini
- Genus: Retrachydes; Hüdepohl, 1985
- Species: R. thoracicus

Binomial name
- Retrachydes thoracicus (Olivier, 1790)

= Retrachydes =

Genus of beetles

Retrachydes thoracicus is a species of beetle in the family Cerambycidae, the only species in the genus Retrachydes.

== Description ==
Retrachydes thoracicus can reach a length of 16.5–33 millimetres (0.65–1.30 in). This species has a transversely gibbous pronotum and orange-banded long antennae. Body is densely pubescent.

== Distribution ==
This species is present in South America (Argentina, Brazil, Uruguay, Paraguay and Bolivia).
