= Aegoidus weyrauchi =

Scientific classification
- Domain: Eukaryota
- Kingdom: Animalia
- Phylum: Arthropoda
- Class: Insecta
- Order: Coleoptera
- Suborder: Polyphaga
- Infraorder: Cucujiformia
- Family: Cerambycidae
- Genus: Aegoidus
- Species: A. weyrauchi

Binomial name
- Aegoidus weyrauchi Tippmann, 1953

Species of beetle

Aegoidus weyrauchi is a species of beetle in the family Cerambycidae. It was described by Tippmann in 1953.
