= Xylocaris =

Xylocaris oculata

Scientific classification
- Kingdom: Animalia
- Phylum: Arthropoda
- Class: Insecta
- Order: Coleoptera
- Suborder: Polyphaga
- Infraorder: Cucujiformia
- Family: Cerambycidae
- Genus: Xylocaris
- Species: X. oculata

Binomial name
- Xylocaris oculata Dupont in Audinet-Serville, 1834

Genus of beetles

Xylocaris oculata is a species of beetle in the family Cerambycidae, the only species in the genus Xylocaris.
