= Andrachydes =

Andrachydes transandinus

Scientific classification
- Kingdom: Animalia
- Phylum: Arthropoda
- Class: Insecta
- Order: Coleoptera
- Suborder: Polyphaga
- Infraorder: Cucujiformia
- Family: Cerambycidae
- Genus: Andrachydes
- Species: A. transandinus

Binomial name
- Andrachydes transandinus (Tippmann, 1953)

Genus of beetles

Andrachydes transandinus is a species of beetle in the family Cerambycidae, the only species in the genus Andrachydes.
