= Ozodera =

Ozodera callidioides

Scientific classification
- Kingdom: Animalia
- Phylum: Arthropoda
- Class: Insecta
- Order: Coleoptera
- Suborder: Polyphaga
- Infraorder: Cucujiformia
- Family: Cerambycidae
- Genus: Ozodera
- Species: O. callidioides

Binomial name
- Ozodera callidioides Dupont, 1840

Genus of beetles

Ozodera callidioides is a species of beetle in the family Cerambycidae, the only species in the genus Ozodera.
