= Palaeotrachyderes =

Palaeotrachyderes laticornis

Scientific classification
- Kingdom: Animalia
- Phylum: Arthropoda
- Class: Insecta
- Order: Coleoptera
- Suborder: Polyphaga
- Infraorder: Cucujiformia
- Family: Cerambycidae
- Genus: Palaeotrachyderes
- Species: P. laticornis

Binomial name
- Palaeotrachyderes laticornis Tippmann, 1960

Genus of beetles

Palaeotrachyderes laticornis is a species of beetle in the family Cerambycidae, the only species in the genus Palaeotrachyderes.
