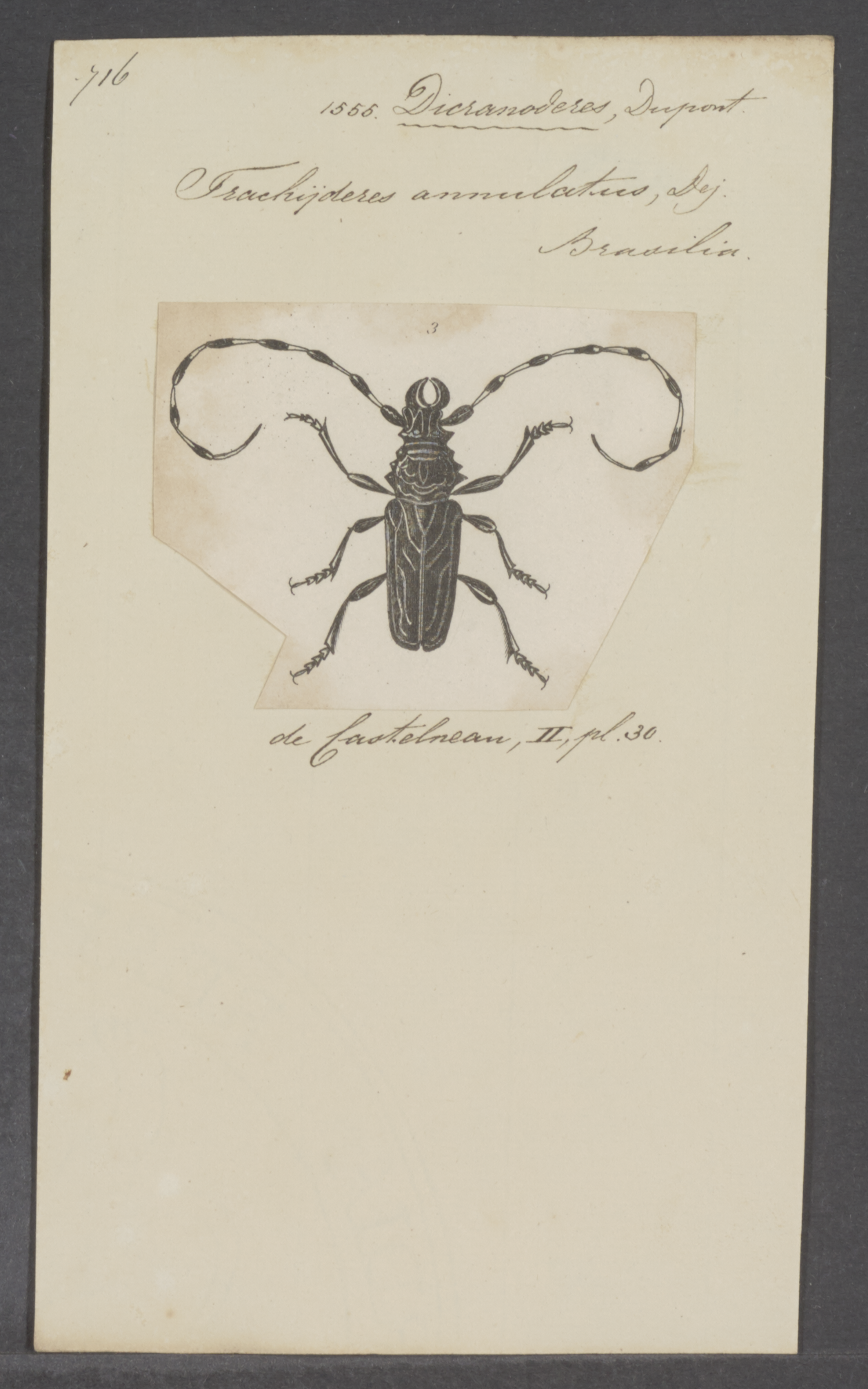

Scientific classification
- Kingdom: Animalia
- Phylum: Arthropoda
- Class: Insecta
- Order: Coleoptera
- Suborder: Polyphaga
- Infraorder: Cucujiformia
- Family: Cerambycidae
- Genus: Dicranoderes
- Species: D. annulatus

Binomial name
- Dicranoderes annulatus Dupont, 1836

= Dicranoderes =

Dicranoderes annulatus

Genus of beetles

Dicranoderes annulatus is a species of beetle in the family Cerambycidae, the only species in the genus Dicranoderes.
