= Pteroplatidius =

Pteroplatidius octocostatus

Scientific classification
- Kingdom: Animalia
- Phylum: Arthropoda
- Clade: Pancrustacea
- Class: Insecta
- Order: Coleoptera
- Suborder: Polyphaga
- Infraorder: Cucujiformia
- Family: Cerambycidae
- Genus: Pteroplatidius
- Species: P. octocostatus

Binomial name
- Pteroplatidius octocostatus (Bates, 1880)

Genus of beetles

Pteroplatidius octocostatus is a species of beetle in the family Cerambycidae, the only species in the genus Pteroplatidius.
