= Monneellus =

Monneellus rhodopus

Scientific classification
- Kingdom: Animalia
- Phylum: Arthropoda
- Class: Insecta
- Order: Coleoptera
- Suborder: Polyphaga
- Infraorder: Cucujiformia
- Family: Cerambycidae
- Genus: Monneellus
- Species: M. rhodopus

Binomial name
- Monneellus rhodopus (Bates, 1870)

Genus of beetles

Monneellus rhodopus is a species of beetle belonging to the Cerambycidae family, the only species in the genus Monneellus.
