= Nothoprodontia =

Nothoprodontia boliviana

Scientific classification
- Kingdom: Animalia
- Phylum: Arthropoda
- Class: Insecta
- Order: Coleoptera
- Suborder: Polyphaga
- Infraorder: Cucujiformia
- Family: Cerambycidae
- Genus: Nothoprodontia
- Species: N. boliviana

Binomial name
- Nothoprodontia boliviana Monne & Monne, 2004

Genus of beetles

Nothoprodontia boliviana is a species of beetle in the family Cerambycidae, the only species in the genus Nothoprodontia.
