= Hudepohlellus =

Hudepohlellus semilunatus

Scientific classification
- Kingdom: Animalia
- Phylum: Arthropoda
- Class: Insecta
- Order: Coleoptera
- Suborder: Polyphaga
- Infraorder: Cucujiformia
- Family: Cerambycidae
- Genus: Hudepohlellus
- Species: H. semilunatus

Binomial name
- Hudepohlellus semilunatus Chemsak & Hovore, in Eya, 2010

Genus of beetles

Hudepohlellus semilunatus is a species of beetle in the family Cerambycidae, the only species in the genus Hudepohlellus.
