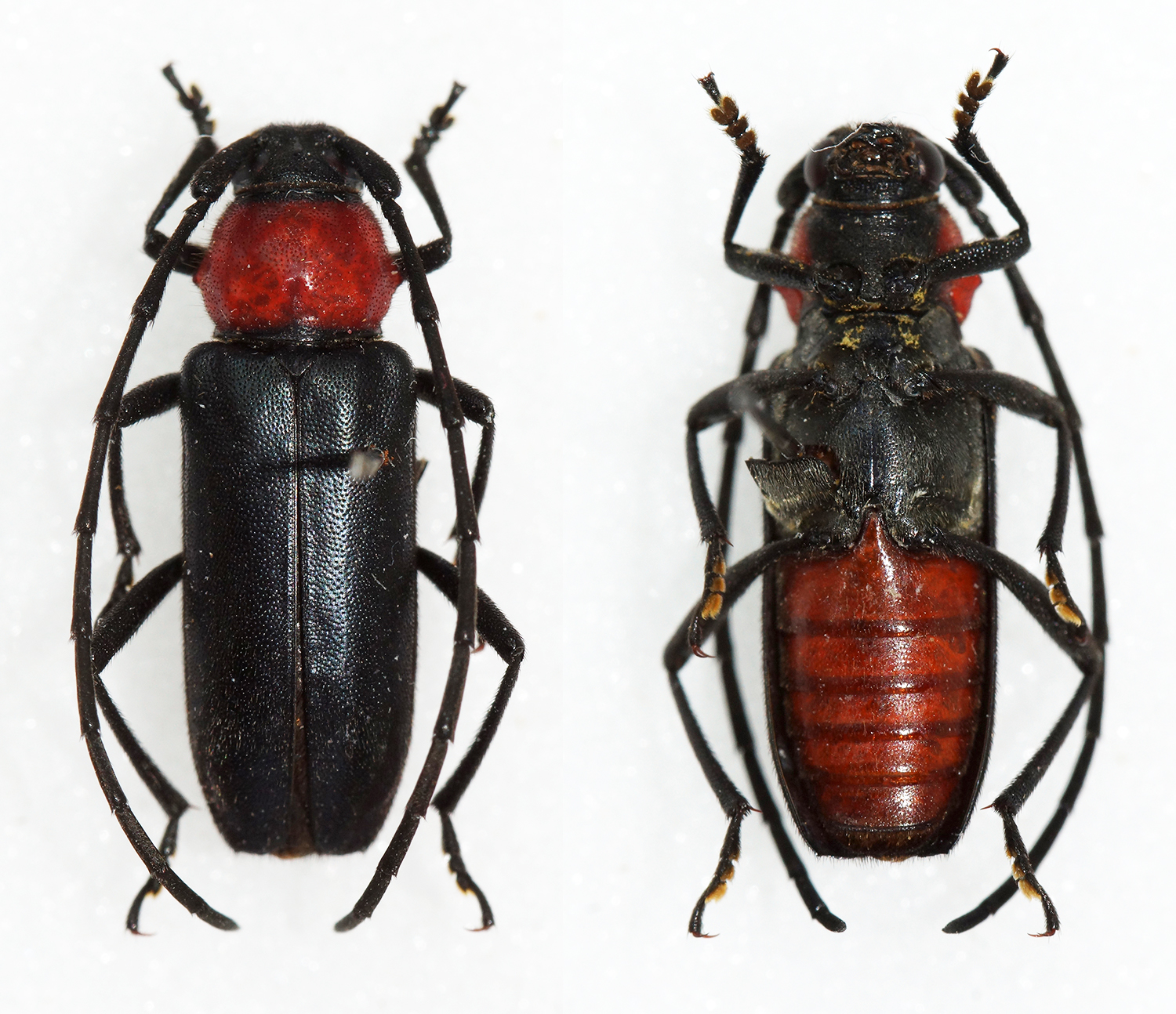

Scientific classification
- Kingdom: Animalia
- Phylum: Arthropoda
- Class: Insecta
- Order: Coleoptera
- Suborder: Polyphaga
- Infraorder: Cucujiformia
- Family: Cerambycidae
- Genus: Muscidora
- Species: M. tricolor

Binomial name
- Muscidora tricolor Thomson, 1864

= Muscidora =

Muscidora tricolor

Genus of beetles

Muscidora tricolor is a species of beetle in the family Cerambycidae, the only species in the genus Muscidora.
