= Exallancyla =

Exallancyla tuberculicollis

Scientific classification
- Kingdom: Animalia
- Phylum: Arthropoda
- Class: Insecta
- Order: Coleoptera
- Suborder: Polyphaga
- Infraorder: Cucujiformia
- Family: Cerambycidae
- Genus: Exallancyla
- Species: E. tuberculicollis

Binomial name
- Exallancyla tuberculicollis Aurivillius, 1920

Genus of beetles

Exallancyla tuberculicollis is a species of beetle in the family Cerambycidae, the only species in the genus Exallancyla.
