= Prodontia =

Prodontia dimidiata

Scientific classification
- Kingdom: Animalia
- Phylum: Arthropoda
- Clade: Pancrustacea
- Class: Insecta
- Order: Coleoptera
- Suborder: Polyphaga
- Infraorder: Cucujiformia
- Family: Cerambycidae
- Genus: Prodontia
- Species: P. dimidiata

Binomial name
- Prodontia dimidiata Audinet-Serville, 1834

Genus of beetles

Prodontia dimidiata is a species of beetle in the family Cerambycidae, the only species in the genus Prodontia.
