= Chevrolatella =

Chevrolatella tripunctata

Scientific classification
- Kingdom: Animalia
- Phylum: Arthropoda
- Class: Insecta
- Order: Coleoptera
- Suborder: Polyphaga
- Infraorder: Cucujiformia
- Family: Cerambycidae
- Genus: Chevrolatella
- Species: C. tripunctata

Binomial name
- Chevrolatella tripunctata (Chevrolat, 1862)

Genus of beetles

Chevrolatella tripunctata is a species of beetle in the family Cerambycidae, the only species in the genus Chevrolatella.
