= Neocrossidius =

Neocrossidius trivittatus

Scientific classification
- Kingdom: Animalia
- Phylum: Arthropoda
- Class: Insecta
- Order: Coleoptera
- Suborder: Polyphaga
- Infraorder: Cucujiformia
- Family: Cerambycidae
- Genus: Neocrossidius
- Species: N. trivittatus

Binomial name
- Neocrossidius trivittatus (Bates, 1880)

Genus of beetles

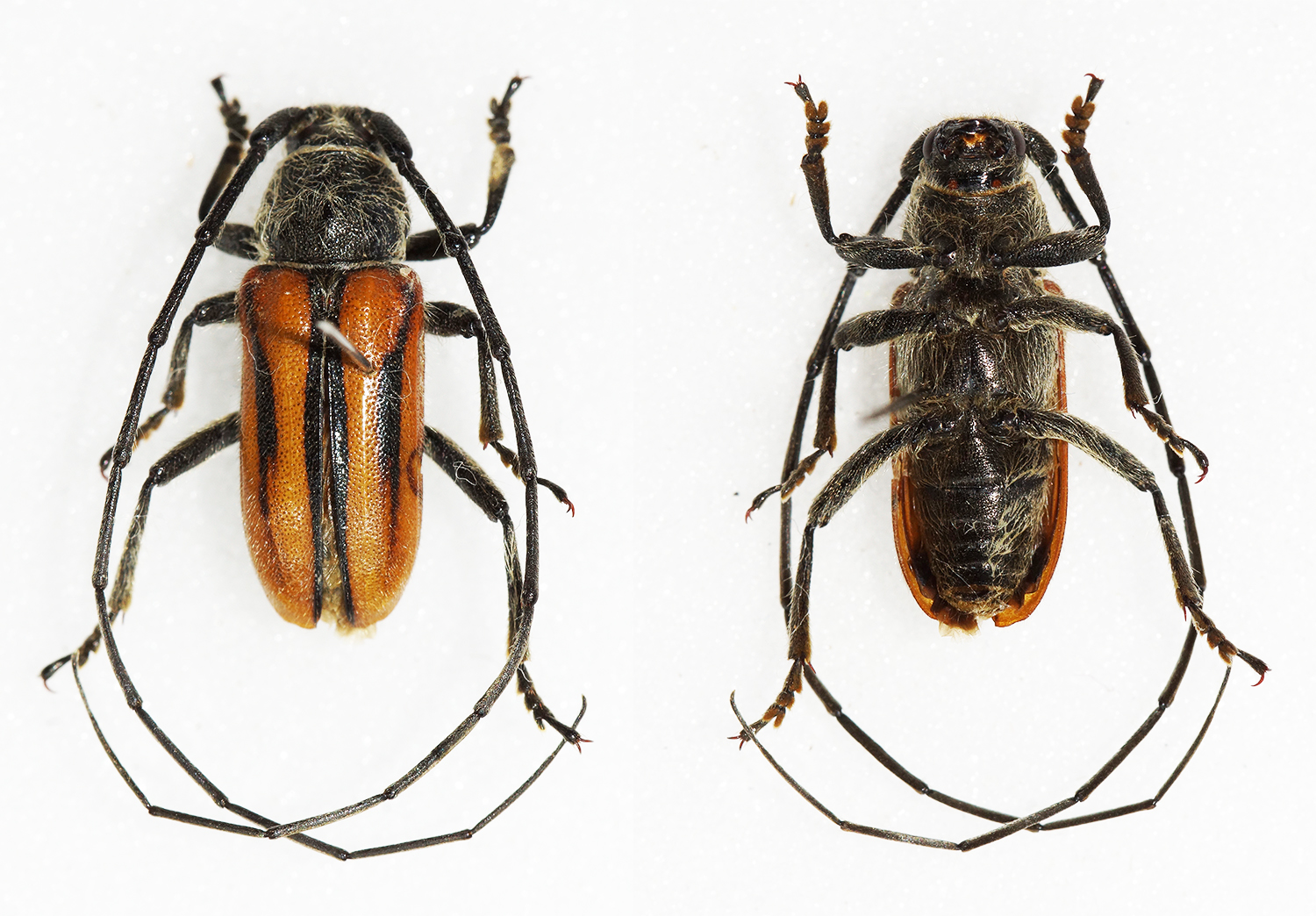
Neocrossidius trivittatus.

Neocrossidius trivittatus is a species of beetle in the family Cerambycidae, the only species in the genus Neocrossidius.
