= Placoschema =

Placoschema dimorpha

Scientific classification
- Kingdom: Animalia
- Phylum: Arthropoda
- Class: Insecta
- Order: Coleoptera
- Suborder: Polyphaga
- Infraorder: Cucujiformia
- Family: Cerambycidae
- Genus: Placoschema
- Species: P. dimorpha

Binomial name
- Placoschema dimorpha Chemsak & Hovore, in Eya, 2010

Genus of beetles

Placoschema dimorpha is a species of beetle in the family Cerambycidae, the only species in the genus Placoschema.
