= Cryptobias =

Cryptobias coccineus

Scientific classification
- Kingdom: Animalia
- Phylum: Arthropoda
- Class: Insecta
- Order: Coleoptera
- Suborder: Polyphaga
- Infraorder: Cucujiformia
- Family: Cerambycidae
- Genus: Cryptobias
- Species: C. coccineus

Binomial name
- Cryptobias coccineus Dupont in Audinet-Serville, 1834

Genus of beetles

Cryptobias coccineus is a species of beetle in the family Cerambycidae, the only species in the genus Cryptobias.
