= Steinheilia =

Steinheilia mandibularis

Scientific classification
- Kingdom: Animalia
- Phylum: Arthropoda
- Clade: Pancrustacea
- Class: Insecta
- Order: Coleoptera
- Suborder: Polyphaga
- Infraorder: Cucujiformia
- Family: Cerambycidae
- Genus: Steinheilia
- Species: S. mandibularis

Binomial name
- Steinheilia mandibularis Lane, 1973

Genus of beetles

Steinheilia mandibularis is a species of beetle in the family Cerambycidae, the only species in the genus Steinheilia.
