= Pleuromenus =

Pleuromenus baccifer

Scientific classification
- Kingdom: Animalia
- Phylum: Arthropoda
- Class: Insecta
- Order: Coleoptera
- Suborder: Polyphaga
- Infraorder: Cucujiformia
- Family: Cerambycidae
- Genus: Pleuromenus
- Species: P. baccifer

Binomial name
- Pleuromenus baccifer Bates, 1872

Genus of beetles

Pleuromenus baccifer is a species of beetle in the family Cerambycidae, the only species in the genus Pleuromenus.
