= Phimosia =

Phimosia ebenina

Scientific classification
- Kingdom: Animalia
- Phylum: Arthropoda
- Clade: Pancrustacea
- Class: Insecta
- Order: Coleoptera
- Suborder: Polyphaga
- Infraorder: Cucujiformia
- Family: Cerambycidae
- Genus: Phimosia
- Species: P. ebenina

Binomial name
- Phimosia ebenina Bates, 1870

Genus of beetles

Phimosia ebenina is a species of beetle in the family Cerambycidae, the only species in the genus Phimosia.
