= Unachlorus =

Unachlorus viridis

Scientific classification
- Kingdom: Animalia
- Phylum: Arthropoda
- Class: Insecta
- Order: Coleoptera
- Suborder: Polyphaga
- Infraorder: Cucujiformia
- Family: Cerambycidae
- Genus: Unachlorus
- Species: U. viridis

Binomial name
- Unachlorus viridis Martins & Galileo, 2008

Genus of beetles

Unachlorus viridis is a species of beetle in the family Cerambycidae, the only species in the genus Unachlorus.
