= Micropelta =

Micropelta rugosicollis

Scientific classification
- Kingdom: Animalia
- Phylum: Arthropoda
- Class: Insecta
- Order: Coleoptera
- Suborder: Polyphaga
- Infraorder: Cucujiformia
- Family: Cerambycidae
- Genus: Micropelta
- Species: M. rugosicollis

Binomial name
- Micropelta rugosicollis Zajciw, 1961

Genus of beetles

Micropelta rugosicollis is a species of beetle in the family Cerambycidae, the only species in the genus Micropelta.
