= Megaderus =

Scientific classification
- Kingdom: Animalia
- Phylum: Arthropoda
- Class: Insecta
- Order: Coleoptera
- Suborder: Polyphaga
- Infraorder: Cucujiformia
- Family: Cerambycidae
- Subtribe: Trachyderina
- Genus: Megaderus; Dejean, 1821

Genus of beetles

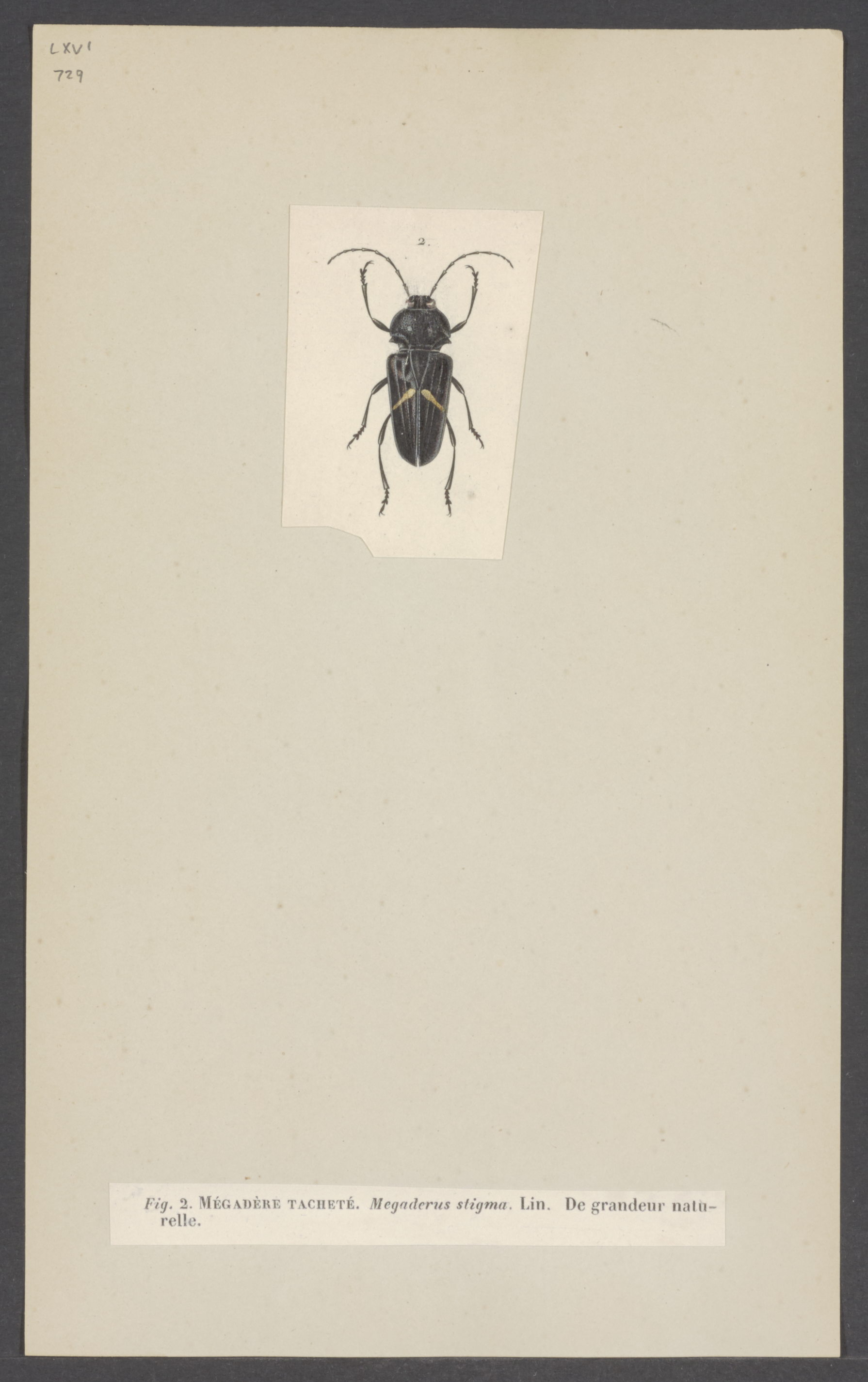
A print of the Megaderus

Megaderus is a genus of long-horned beetles in the family Cerambycidae. There are at least two described species in Megaderus.

== Species ==
These two species belong to the genus Megaderus:

- Megaderus bifasciatus (Dupont, 1836) — Found in North America and Central America
- Megaderus stigma (Linnaeus, 1758) — Found in South America and Central America
