= Gortonia =

Gortonia linsleyi

Scientific classification
- Kingdom: Animalia
- Phylum: Arthropoda
- Class: Insecta
- Order: Coleoptera
- Suborder: Polyphaga
- Infraorder: Cucujiformia
- Family: Cerambycidae
- Genus: Gortonia
- Species: G. linsleyi

Binomial name
- Gortonia linsleyi Hovore, 1987

Genus of beetles

Gortonia linsleyi is a species of beetle in the family Cerambycidae, the only species in the genus Gortonia.
