= Allopeplus =

Allopeplus cordifer

Scientific classification
- Kingdom: Animalia
- Phylum: Arthropoda
- Class: Insecta
- Order: Coleoptera
- Suborder: Polyphaga
- Infraorder: Cucujiformia
- Family: Cerambycidae
- Genus: Allopeplus
- Species: A. cordifer

Binomial name
- Allopeplus cordifer Zajciw, 1961

Genus of beetles

Allopeplus cordifer is a species of beetle in the family Cerambycidae, the only species in the genus Allopeplus.
