= Phoenidnus =

Phoenidnus lissonotoides

Scientific classification
- Kingdom: Animalia
- Phylum: Arthropoda
- Class: Insecta
- Order: Coleoptera
- Suborder: Polyphaga
- Infraorder: Cucujiformia
- Family: Cerambycidae
- Genus: Phoenidnus
- Species: P. lissonotoides

Binomial name
- Phoenidnus lissonotoides Pascoe, 1866

Genus of beetles

Phoenidnus lissonotoides is a species of beetle in the family Cerambycidae, the only species in the genus Phoenidnus.
