= Tamenes =

Tamenes sarda

Scientific classification
- Kingdom: Animalia
- Phylum: Arthropoda
- Class: Insecta
- Order: Coleoptera
- Suborder: Polyphaga
- Infraorder: Cucujiformia
- Family: Cerambycidae
- Genus: Tamenes
- Species: T. sarda

Binomial name
- Tamenes sarda Gounelle, 1912

Genus of beetles

Tamenes sarda is a species of beetle in the family Cerambycidae, the only species in the genus Tamenes.
