= Gonyacantha =

Gonyacantha rubronigra

Scientific classification
- Kingdom: Animalia
- Phylum: Arthropoda
- Class: Insecta
- Order: Coleoptera
- Suborder: Polyphaga
- Infraorder: Cucujiformia
- Family: Cerambycidae
- Genus: Gonyacantha
- Species: G. rubronigra

Binomial name
- Gonyacantha rubronigra Thomson, 1858

Genus of beetles

Gonyacantha rubronigra is a species of beetle in the family Cerambycidae, the only species in the genus Gonyacantha.
