= Molitones =

Molitones flavipennis

Scientific classification
- Kingdom: Animalia
- Phylum: Arthropoda
- Class: Insecta
- Order: Coleoptera
- Suborder: Polyphaga
- Infraorder: Cucujiformia
- Family: Cerambycidae
- Genus: Molitones
- Species: M. flavipennis

Binomial name
- Molitones flavipennis Gounelle, 1913

Genus of beetles

Molitones flavipennis is a species of beetle in the family Cerambycidae, the only species in the genus Molitones.
