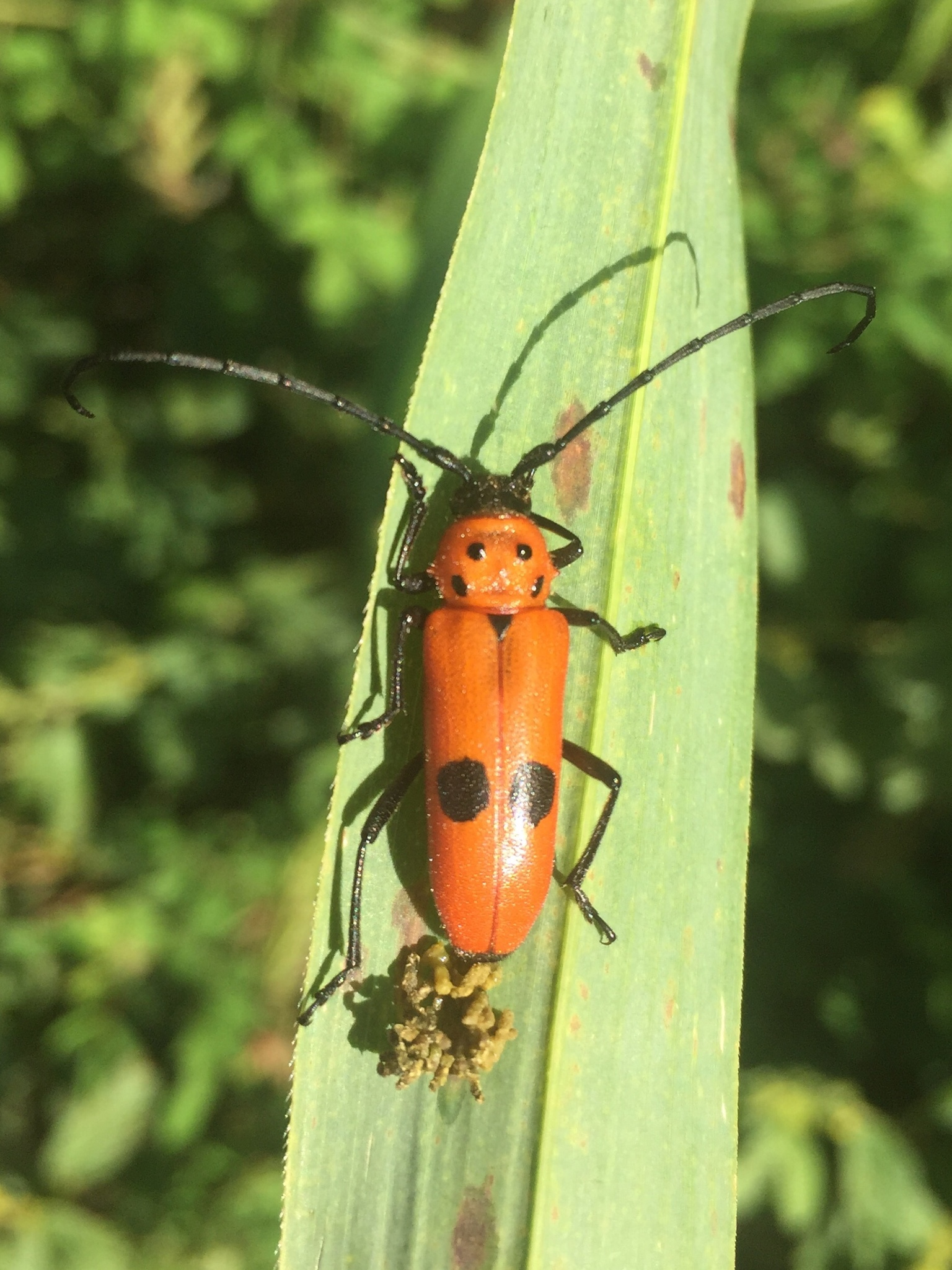
- H. distigma in Puente Nacional, Mexico

Scientific classification
- Kingdom: Animalia
- Phylum: Arthropoda
- Class: Insecta
- Order: Coleoptera
- Suborder: Polyphaga
- Infraorder: Cucujiformia
- Family: Cerambycidae
- Genus: Hoegea
- Species: H. distigma

Binomial name
- Hoegea distigma Bates, 1885

= Hoegea =

Hoegea distigma

Genus of beetles

Hoegea distigma is a species of beetles in the family Cerambycidae, the only species in the genus Hoegea.
