= Parabatyle =

Parabatyle sanguiniventris

Scientific classification
- Kingdom: Animalia
- Phylum: Arthropoda
- Class: Insecta
- Order: Coleoptera
- Suborder: Polyphaga
- Infraorder: Cucujiformia
- Family: Cerambycidae
- Genus: Parabatyle
- Species: P. sanguiniventris

Binomial name
- Parabatyle sanguiniventris (Chevrolat, 1862)

Genus of beetles

Parabatyle sanguiniventris is a species of beetle in the family Cerambycidae, the only species in the genus Parabatyle.
