= Zalophia =

Zalophia funebris

Scientific classification
- Kingdom: Animalia
- Phylum: Arthropoda
- Class: Insecta
- Order: Coleoptera
- Suborder: Polyphaga
- Infraorder: Cucujiformia
- Family: Cerambycidae
- Genus: Zalophia
- Species: Z. funebris

Binomial name
- Zalophia funebris (Bates, 1880)

Genus of beetles

Zalophia funebris is a species of beetle in the family Cerambycidae, the only species in the genus Zalophia.
