= Pseudostenaspis =

Pseudostenaspis hermanni

Scientific classification
- Kingdom: Animalia
- Phylum: Arthropoda
- Clade: Pancrustacea
- Class: Insecta
- Order: Coleoptera
- Suborder: Polyphaga
- Infraorder: Cucujiformia
- Family: Cerambycidae
- Genus: Pseudostenaspis
- Species: P. hermanni

Binomial name
- Pseudostenaspis hermanni Melzer, 1932

Genus of beetles

Pseudostenaspis hermanni is a species of beetle in the family Cerambycidae, the only species in the genus Pseudostenaspis.
