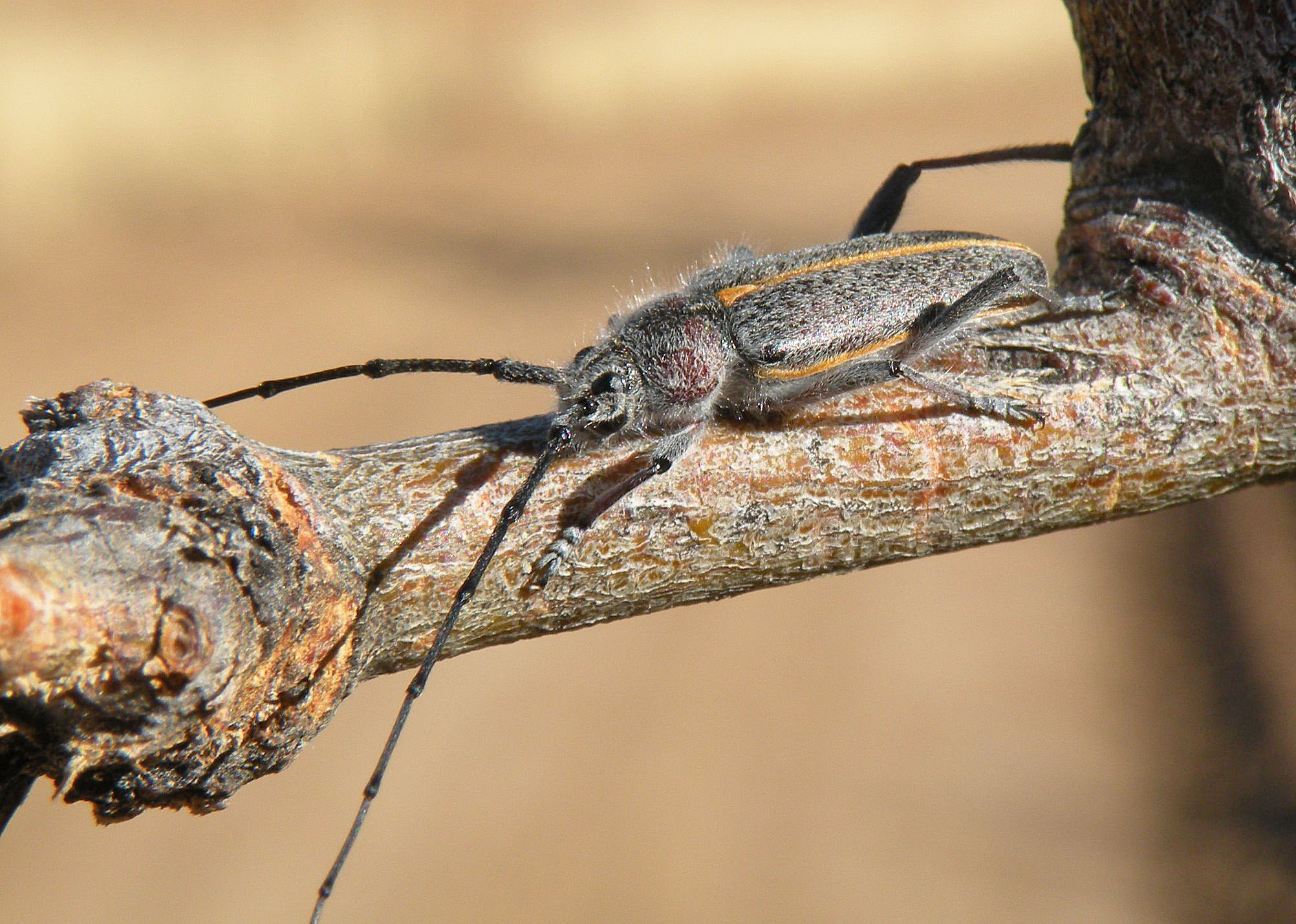

Scientific classification
- Kingdom: Animalia
- Phylum: Arthropoda
- Class: Insecta
- Order: Coleoptera
- Suborder: Polyphaga
- Infraorder: Cucujiformia
- Family: Cerambycidae
- Genus: Schizax
- Species: S. senex

Binomial name
- Schizax senex LeConte, 1873

= Schizax =

Schizax senex

Genus of beetles

Schizax senex is a species of beetle in the family Cerambycidae, the only species in the genus Schizax.
