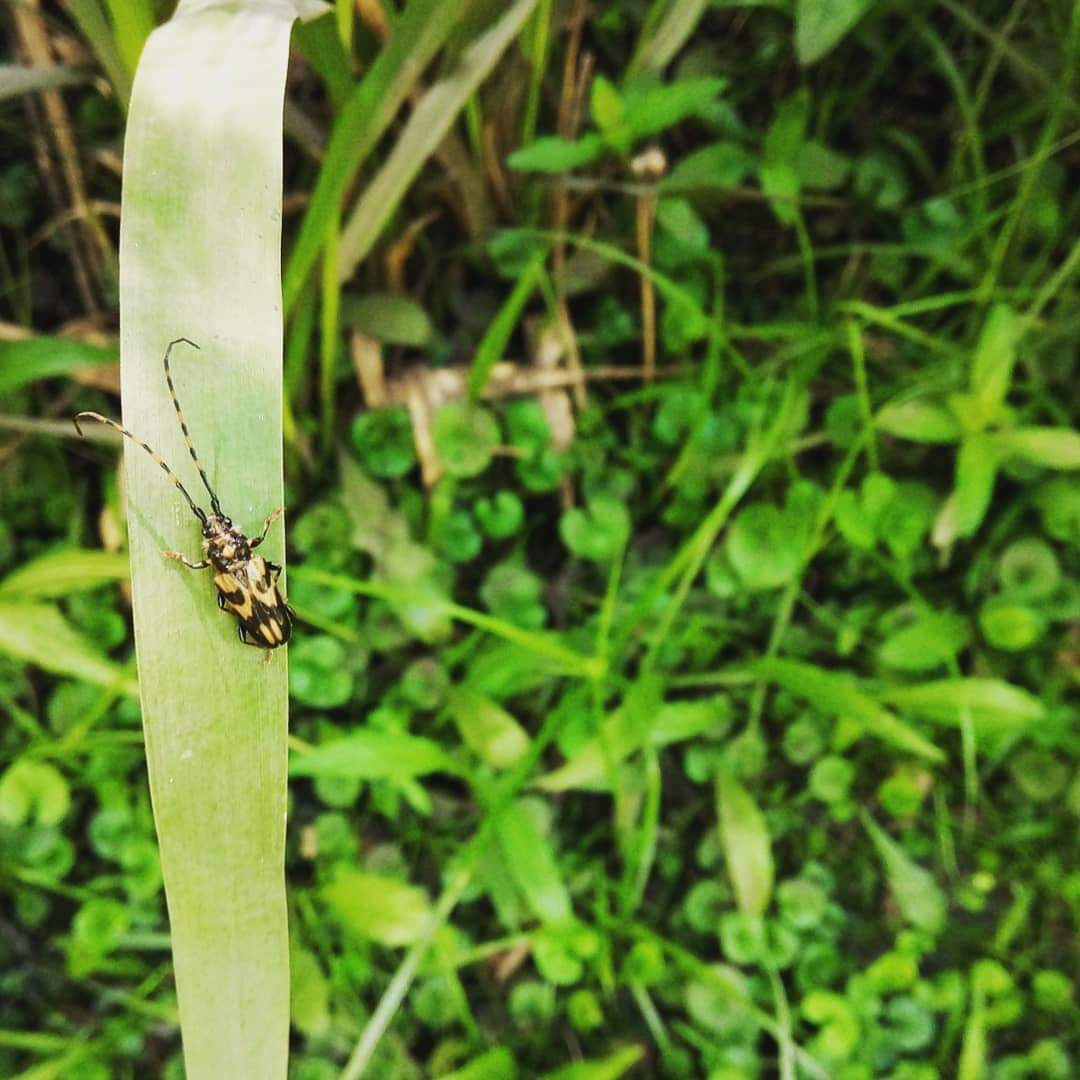
- Martinsellus signatus from Rincón de Santa Lucía - Uruguay

Scientific classification
- Kingdom: Animalia
- Phylum: Arthropoda
- Clade: Pancrustacea
- Class: Insecta
- Order: Coleoptera
- Suborder: Polyphaga
- Infraorder: Cucujiformia
- Family: Cerambycidae
- Genus: Martinsellus
- Species: M. signatus

Binomial name
- Martinsellus signatus (Gyllenhal in Schoenherr, 1817)

= Martinsellus =

Martinsellus signatus

Genus of beetles

Martinsellus signatus is a species of beetle in the family Cerambycidae, the only species in the genus Martinsellus. It is found in Brazil (Goiás, Mato Grosso do Sul, Bahia, Minas Gerais, Espírito Santo, Rio de Janeiro, São Paulo, Paraná, Santa Catarina, Rio Grande do Sul), Bolivia (Santa Cruz), Paraguay, Argentina (Misiones, Corrientes, Buenos Aires) and Uruguay.
