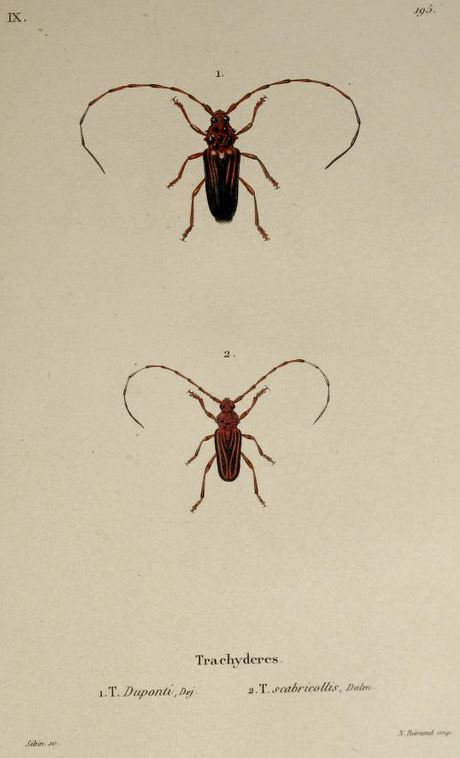
- Illustration of Drychateres bilineatus depicted in Figure 1.

Scientific classification
- Kingdom: Animalia
- Phylum: Arthropoda
- Class: Insecta
- Order: Coleoptera
- Suborder: Polyphaga
- Infraorder: Cucujiformia
- Family: Cerambycidae
- Genus: Drychateres
- Species: D. bilineatus

Binomial name
- Drychateres bilineatus (Olivier, 1795)

= Drychateres =

Drychateres bilineatus

Genus of beetles

Drychateres bilineatus is a species of beetle in the family Cerambycidae, the only species in the genus Drychateres.
