= Seabriella =

Seabriella fasciata

Scientific classification
- Kingdom: Animalia
- Phylum: Arthropoda
- Class: Insecta
- Order: Coleoptera
- Suborder: Polyphaga
- Infraorder: Cucujiformia
- Family: Cerambycidae
- Genus: Seabriella
- Species: S. fasciata

Binomial name
- Seabriella fasciata Zajciw, 1960

Genus of beetles

Seabriella fasciata is a species of beetle in the family Cerambycidae, the only species in the genus Seabriella.
