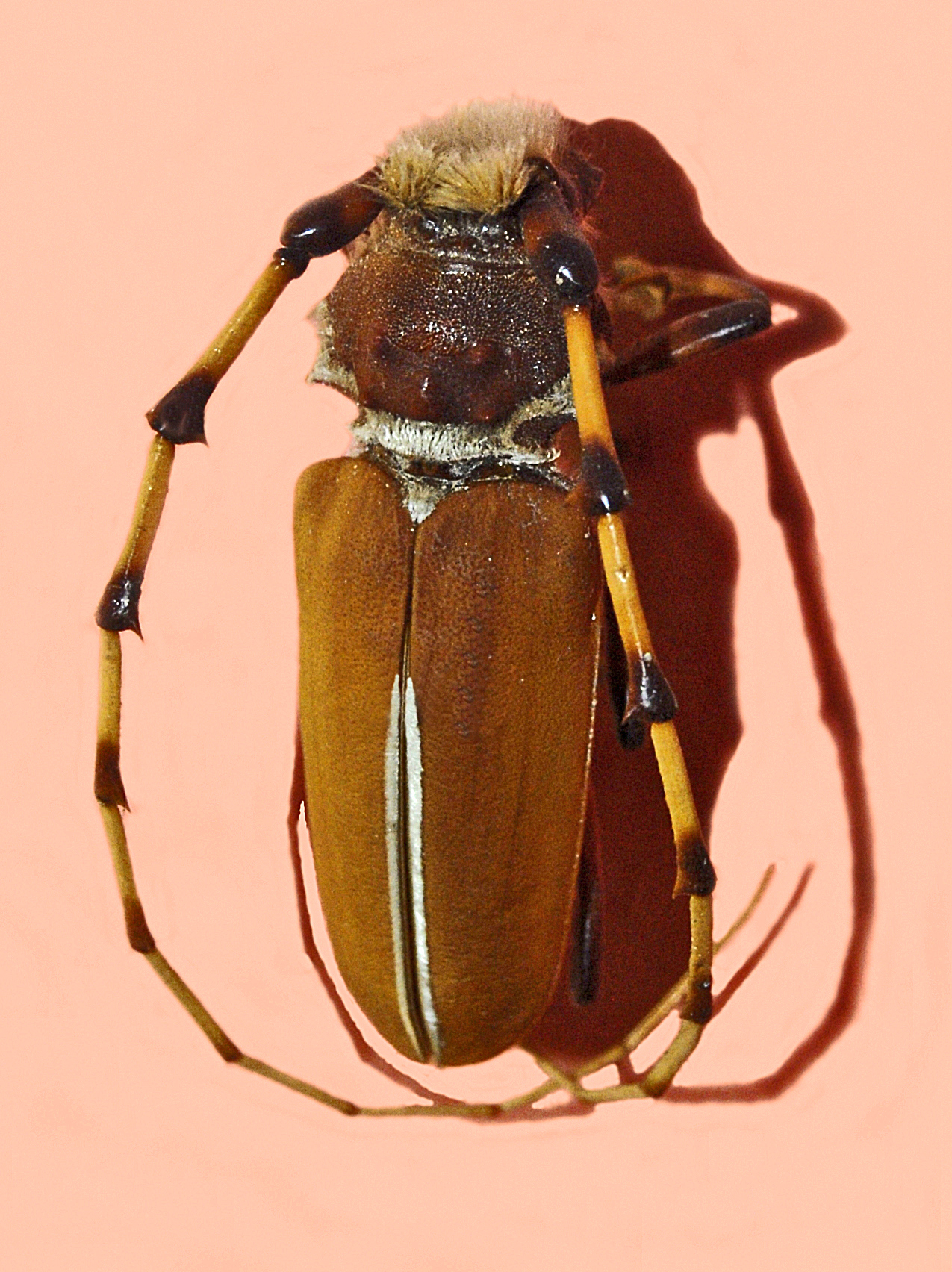
- Museum specimen of Dorcacerus barbatus

Scientific classification
- Kingdom: Animalia
- Phylum: Arthropoda
- Class: Insecta
- Order: Coleoptera
- Suborder: Polyphaga
- Infraorder: Cucujiformia
- Family: Cerambycidae
- Genus: Dorcacerus
- Species: D. barbatus

Binomial name
- Dorcacerus barbatus (Olivier, 1790)

Synonyms
- Cerambyx barbatus Olivier, 1790; Dorcadocerus barbatus (Olivier) Germar, 1824

= Dorcacerus =

Dorcacerus barbatus

Genus of beetles

Dorcacerus barbatus is a species of beetle in the family Cerambycidae, the only species in the genus Dorcacerus.

== Description ==
Dorcacerus barbatus can reach a length of 26–33 millimetres (1.0–1.3 in). In males antennae are longer than the body.

It feeds on Prosopis flexuosa (Leguminosae) and on the invasive weed Lantana camara (Verbenaceae) ad it is considered as a potential biocontrol agent.

== Distribution ==
This species can be found in forests of Mexico, Belize, Guatemala, El Salvador, Honduras, Nicaragua, Costa Rica, Panama, Colombia, Ecuador, Peru, Brazil, Suriname, French Guiana, Guyana, Bolivia, Paraguay and Argentina.

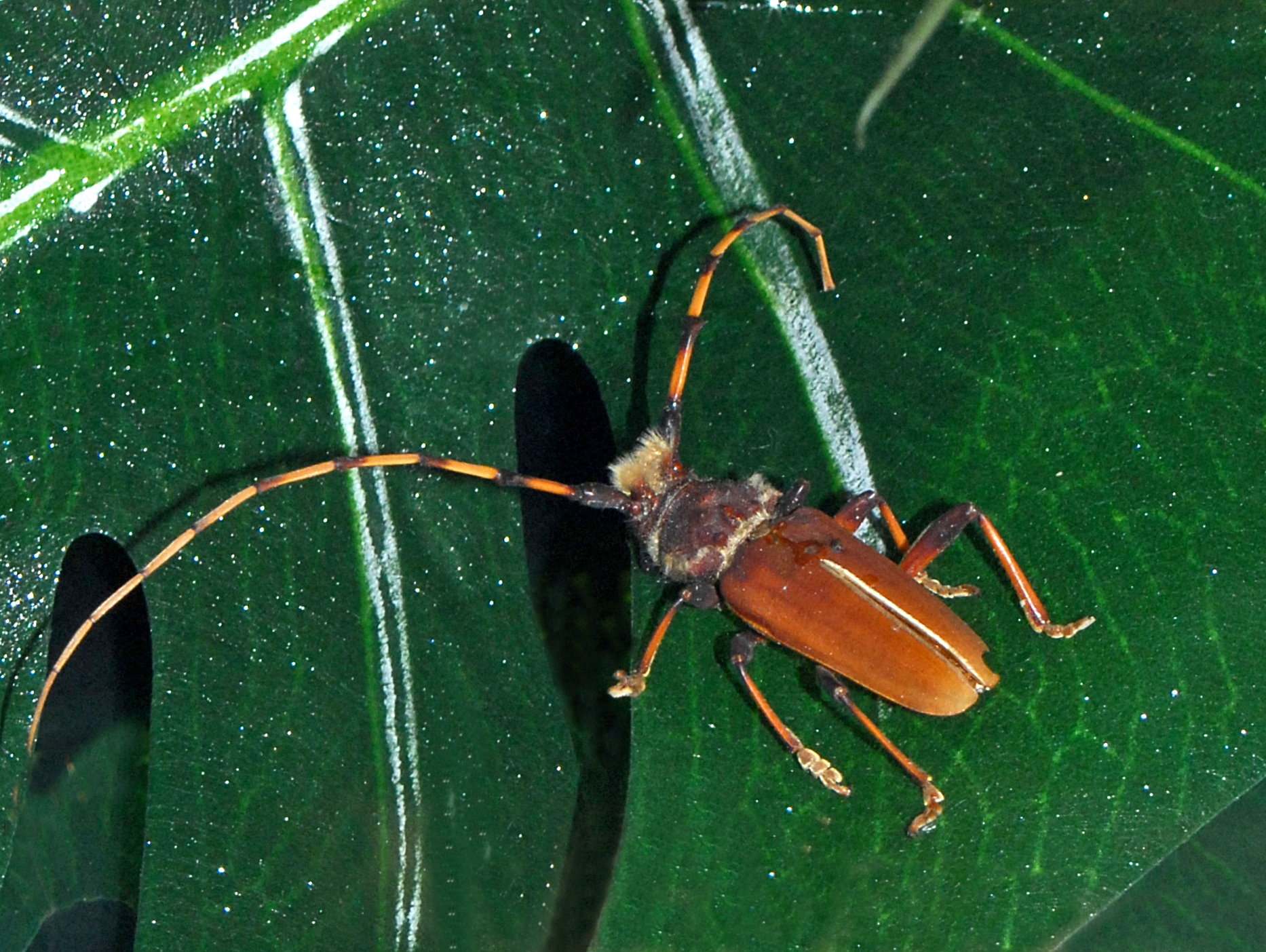
Dorcacerus barbatus
