= Trachyderomorpha =

Trachyderomorpha notabilis

Scientific classification
- Kingdom: Animalia
- Phylum: Arthropoda
- Class: Insecta
- Order: Coleoptera
- Suborder: Polyphaga
- Infraorder: Cucujiformia
- Family: Cerambycidae
- Genus: Trachyderomorpha
- Species: T. notabilis

Binomial name
- Trachyderomorpha notabilis Tippmann, 1960

Genus of beetles

Trachyderomorpha notabilis is a species of beetle in the family Cerambycidae, the only species in the genus Trachyderomorpha.
