= Neochrysoprasis =

Neochrysoprasis zajciwi

Scientific classification
- Kingdom: Animalia
- Phylum: Arthropoda
- Class: Insecta
- Order: Coleoptera
- Suborder: Polyphaga
- Infraorder: Cucujiformia
- Family: Cerambycidae
- Genus: Neochrysoprasis
- Species: N. zajciwi

Binomial name
- Neochrysoprasis zajciwi Franz, 1969

Genus of beetles

Neochrysoprasis zajciwi is a species of beetle in the family Cerambycidae, the only species in the genus Neochrysoprasis.
