= Zonotylus =

Zonotylus interruptus

Scientific classification
- Kingdom: Animalia
- Phylum: Arthropoda
- Class: Insecta
- Order: Coleoptera
- Suborder: Polyphaga
- Infraorder: Cucujiformia
- Family: Cerambycidae
- Genus: Zonotylus
- Species: Z. interruptus

Binomial name
- Zonotylus interruptus (Olivier, 1790)

Genus of beetles

Zonotylus interruptus is a species of beetle in the family Cerambycidae, the only species in the genus Zonotylus.
