= Charinotes =

Charinotes fasciatus

Scientific classification
- Kingdom: Animalia
- Phylum: Arthropoda
- Class: Insecta
- Order: Coleoptera
- Suborder: Polyphaga
- Infraorder: Cucujiformia
- Family: Cerambycidae
- Genus: Charinotes
- Species: C. fasciatus

Binomial name
- Charinotes fasciatus Dupont in Audinet-Serville, 1834

Genus of beetles

Charinotes fasciatus is a species of beetle in the family Cerambycidae, the only species in the genus Charinotes.
