= Scythroleus =

Scythroleus picticornis

Scientific classification
- Kingdom: Animalia
- Phylum: Arthropoda
- Class: Insecta
- Order: Coleoptera
- Suborder: Polyphaga
- Infraorder: Cucujiformia
- Family: Cerambycidae
- Genus: Scythroleus
- Species: S. picticornis

Binomial name
- Scythroleus picticornis Bates, 1885

Species of beetles

Scythroleus picticornis is a species of beetle in the family Cerambycidae, the only species in the genus Scythroleus.
