= Mimonneticus =

Mimonneticus guianae

Scientific classification
- Kingdom: Animalia
- Phylum: Arthropoda
- Class: Insecta
- Order: Coleoptera
- Suborder: Polyphaga
- Infraorder: Cucujiformia
- Family: Cerambycidae
- Genus: Mimonneticus
- Species: M. guianae

Binomial name
- Mimonneticus guianae Monné & Napp, 2000

Genus of beetles

Mimonneticus guianae is a species of beetle in the family Cerambycidae, the only species in the genus Mimonneticus.
