= Megapurpuricenus =

Scientific classification
- Kingdom: Animalia
- Phylum: Arthropoda
- Class: Insecta
- Order: Coleoptera
- Suborder: Polyphaga
- Infraorder: Cucujiformia
- Family: Cerambycidae
- Genus: Megapurpuricenus; Eya, 2015
- Species: M. magnificus

Binomial name
- Megapurpuricenus magnificus (LeConte, 1875)

Synonyms
- Purpuricenus magnificus LeConte, 1875; Crioprosopus magnificus (LeConte, 1875)

Genus of beetles

Megapurpuricenus is a genus of long-horned beetles in the family Cerambycidae containing one described species, M. magnificus.
