= Cyphosterna =

Cyphosterna quadrilineata

Scientific classification
- Kingdom: Animalia
- Phylum: Arthropoda
- Class: Insecta
- Order: Coleoptera
- Suborder: Polyphaga
- Infraorder: Cucujiformia
- Family: Cerambycidae
- Genus: Cyphosterna
- Species: C. quadrilineata

Binomial name
- Cyphosterna quadrilineata Chevrolat, 1862

Genus of beetles

Cyphosterna quadrilineata is a species of beetle in the family Cerambycidae, the only species in the genus Cyphosterna.
