= Parathetesis =

Parathetesis convergens

Scientific classification
- Kingdom: Animalia
- Phylum: Arthropoda
- Class: Insecta
- Order: Coleoptera
- Suborder: Polyphaga
- Infraorder: Cucujiformia
- Family: Cerambycidae
- Genus: Parathetesis
- Species: P. convergens

Binomial name
- Parathetesis convergens (Bates, 1892)

Genus of beetles

Parathetesis convergens is a species of beetle in the family Cerambycidae, the only species in the genus Parathetesis.
