= Desmoderus =

Desmoderus variabilis

Scientific classification
- Kingdom: Animalia
- Phylum: Arthropoda
- Class: Insecta
- Order: Coleoptera
- Suborder: Polyphaga
- Infraorder: Cucujiformia
- Family: Cerambycidae
- Genus: Desmoderus
- Species: D. variabilis

Binomial name
- Desmoderus variabilis Dupont in Audinet-Serville, 1834

Genus of beetles

Desmoderus variabilis is a species of beetle in the family Cerambycidae, the only species in the genus Desmoderus.
