= Neogalissus =

Neogalissus pelidnos

Scientific classification
- Kingdom: Animalia
- Phylum: Arthropoda
- Class: Insecta
- Order: Coleoptera
- Suborder: Polyphaga
- Infraorder: Cucujiformia
- Family: Cerambycidae
- Genus: Neogalissus
- Species: N. pelidnos

Binomial name
- Neogalissus pelidnos Monné & Martins, 1981

Genus of beetles

Neogalissus pelidnos is a species of beetle in the family Cerambycidae, the only species in the genus Neogalissus.
