= Cervilissa =

Cervilissa versicolor

Scientific classification
- Kingdom: Animalia
- Phylum: Arthropoda
- Class: Insecta
- Order: Coleoptera
- Suborder: Polyphaga
- Infraorder: Cucujiformia
- Family: Cerambycidae
- Genus: Cervilissa
- Species: C. versicolor

Binomial name
- Cervilissa versicolor Monné & Monné, 2000

Genus of beetles

Cervilissa versicolor is a species of beetle in the family Cerambycidae, the only species in the genus Cervilissa.
