= Dryobiini =

Scientific classification
- Domain: Eukaryota
- Kingdom: Animalia
- Phylum: Arthropoda
- Class: Insecta
- Order: Coleoptera
- Suborder: Polyphaga
- Infraorder: Cucujiformia
- Family: Cerambycidae
- Subfamily: Cerambycinae
- Tribe: Dryobiini; Linsley, 1964

Tribe of beetles

Dryobiini is a tribe of beetles in the subfamily Cerambycinae, containing the following genera and species:

- Genus Anisotyma (monotypic)
  - Anisotyma soteri Napp & Monne, 2009
- Genus Dryobius
  - Dryobius sexnotatus Linsley, 1957
- Genus Ornithia
  - Ornithia mexicana (Sturm, 1843)
