= Pleocoma shastensis =

Scientific classification
- Kingdom: Animalia
- Phylum: Arthropoda
- Class: Insecta
- Order: Coleoptera
- Suborder: Polyphaga
- Infraorder: Scarabaeiformia
- Family: Pleocomidae
- Genus: Pleocoma
- Species: P. shastensis

Binomial name
- Pleocoma shastensis Van Dyke, 1933

Species of beetle

Pleocoma shastensis is a species of rain beetle in the family Pleocomidae. It is found in North America.
