= Crossidius mojavensis =

Scientific classification
- Domain: Eukaryota
- Kingdom: Animalia
- Phylum: Arthropoda
- Class: Insecta
- Order: Coleoptera
- Suborder: Polyphaga
- Infraorder: Cucujiformia
- Family: Cerambycidae
- Genus: Crossidius
- Species: C. mojavensis

Binomial name
- Crossidius mojavensis Linsley, 1955

Species of beetle

Crossidius mojavensis is a species of beetle in the family Cerambycidae. It was described by Linsley in 1955.
