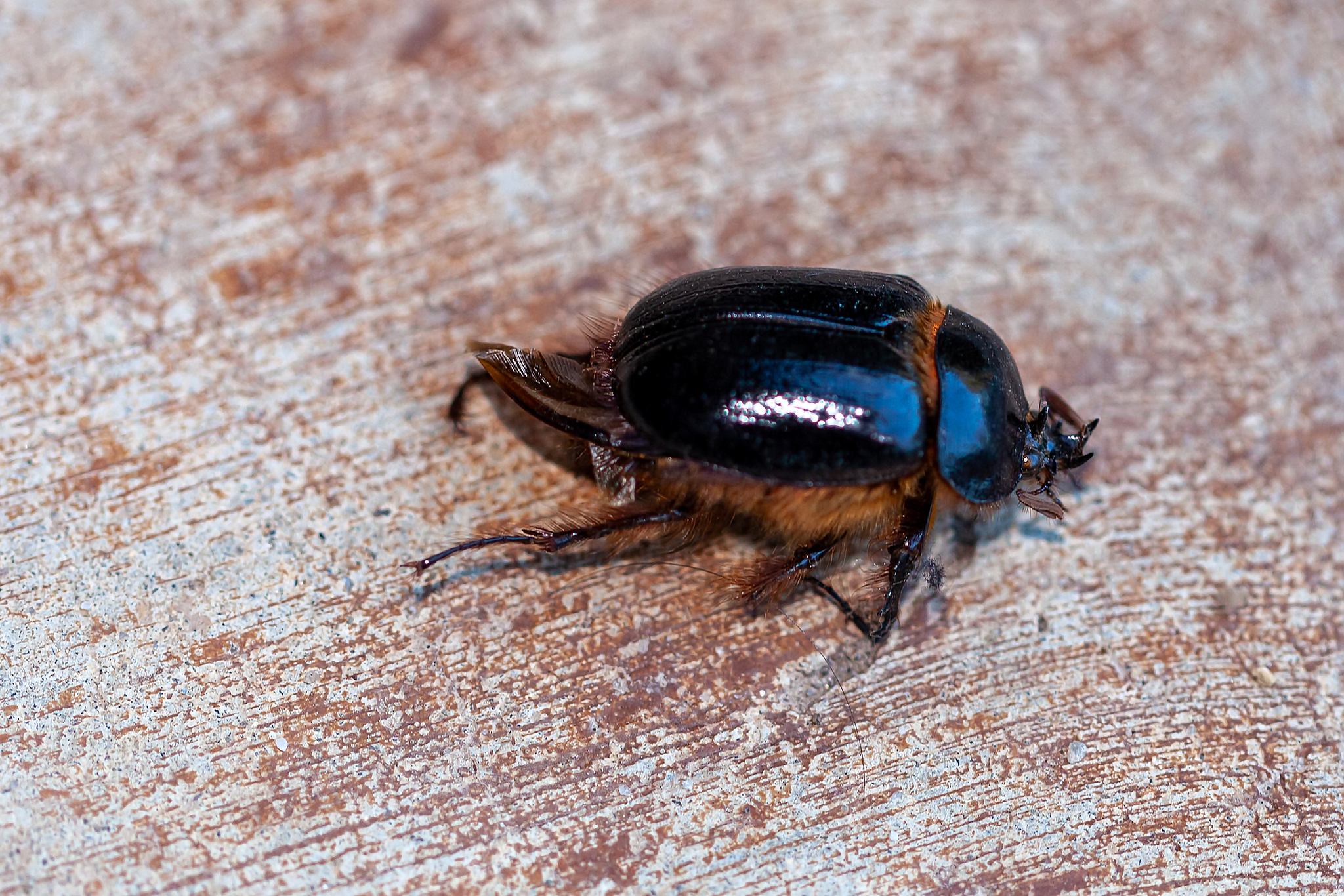
- Pleocoma fimbriata, California

Scientific classification
- Kingdom: Animalia
- Phylum: Arthropoda
- Class: Insecta
- Order: Coleoptera
- Suborder: Polyphaga
- Infraorder: Scarabaeiformia
- Family: Pleocomidae
- Genus: Pleocoma
- Species: P. fimbriata

Binomial name
- Pleocoma fimbriata LeConte, 1856

= Pleocoma fimbriata =

Species of beetle

Pleocoma fimbriata is a species of rain beetle in the family Pleocomidae. It is found in North America.
