= Neotaranomis sinaloae =

Scientific classification
- Kingdom: Animalia
- Phylum: Arthropoda
- Clade: Pancrustacea
- Class: Insecta
- Order: Coleoptera
- Suborder: Polyphaga
- Infraorder: Cucujiformia
- Family: Cerambycidae
- Genus: Neotaranomis
- Species: N. sinaloae

Binomial name
- Neotaranomis sinaloae Chemsak & Linsley, 1982

Species of beetle

Neotaranomis sinaloae is a species of beetle in the family Cerambycidae. It was first described by John Chemsak & Earle Gorton Linsley in 1982.
