= Lamacoscylus usingeri =

Scientific classification
- Kingdom: Animalia
- Phylum: Arthropoda
- Class: Insecta
- Order: Coleoptera
- Suborder: Polyphaga
- Infraorder: Cucujiformia
- Family: Cerambycidae
- Genus: Lamacoscylus
- Species: L. usingeri

Binomial name
- Lamacoscylus usingeri (Linsley, 1935)

Species of beetle

Lamacoscylus usingeri is a species of beetle in the family Cerambycidae. It was described by Earle Gorton Linsley in 1935. It comes from Mexico.
