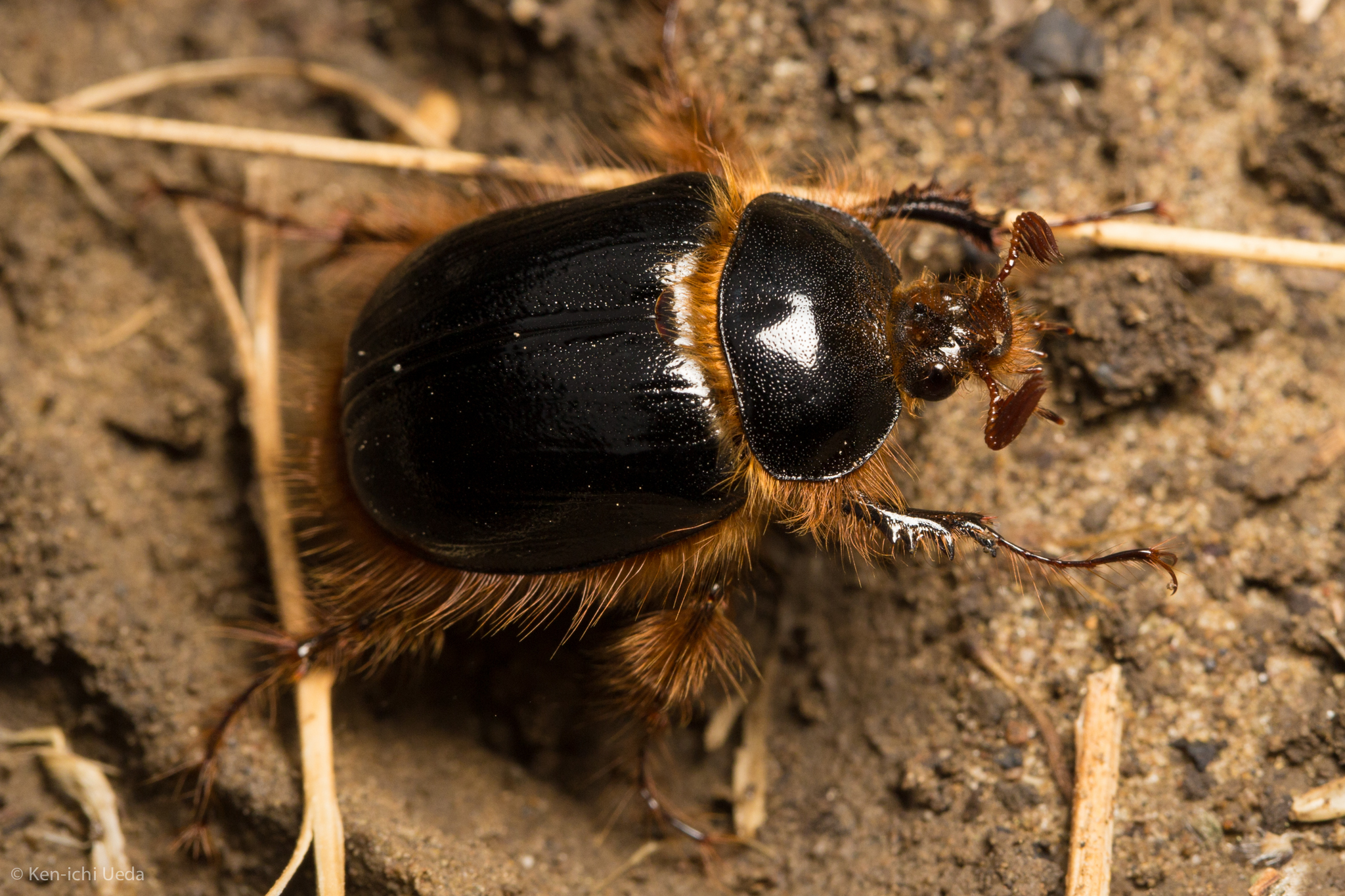
- Pleocoma behrensii, California

Scientific classification
- Domain: Eukaryota
- Kingdom: Animalia
- Phylum: Arthropoda
- Class: Insecta
- Order: Coleoptera
- Suborder: Polyphaga
- Infraorder: Scarabaeiformia
- Family: Pleocomidae
- Genus: Pleocoma
- Species: P. behrensii

Binomial name
- Pleocoma behrensii Leconte, 1874

= Pleocoma behrensii =

Species of beetle

Pleocoma behrensii is a species of rain beetle in the family Pleocomidae. It is found on the Pacific Coast of North America.
