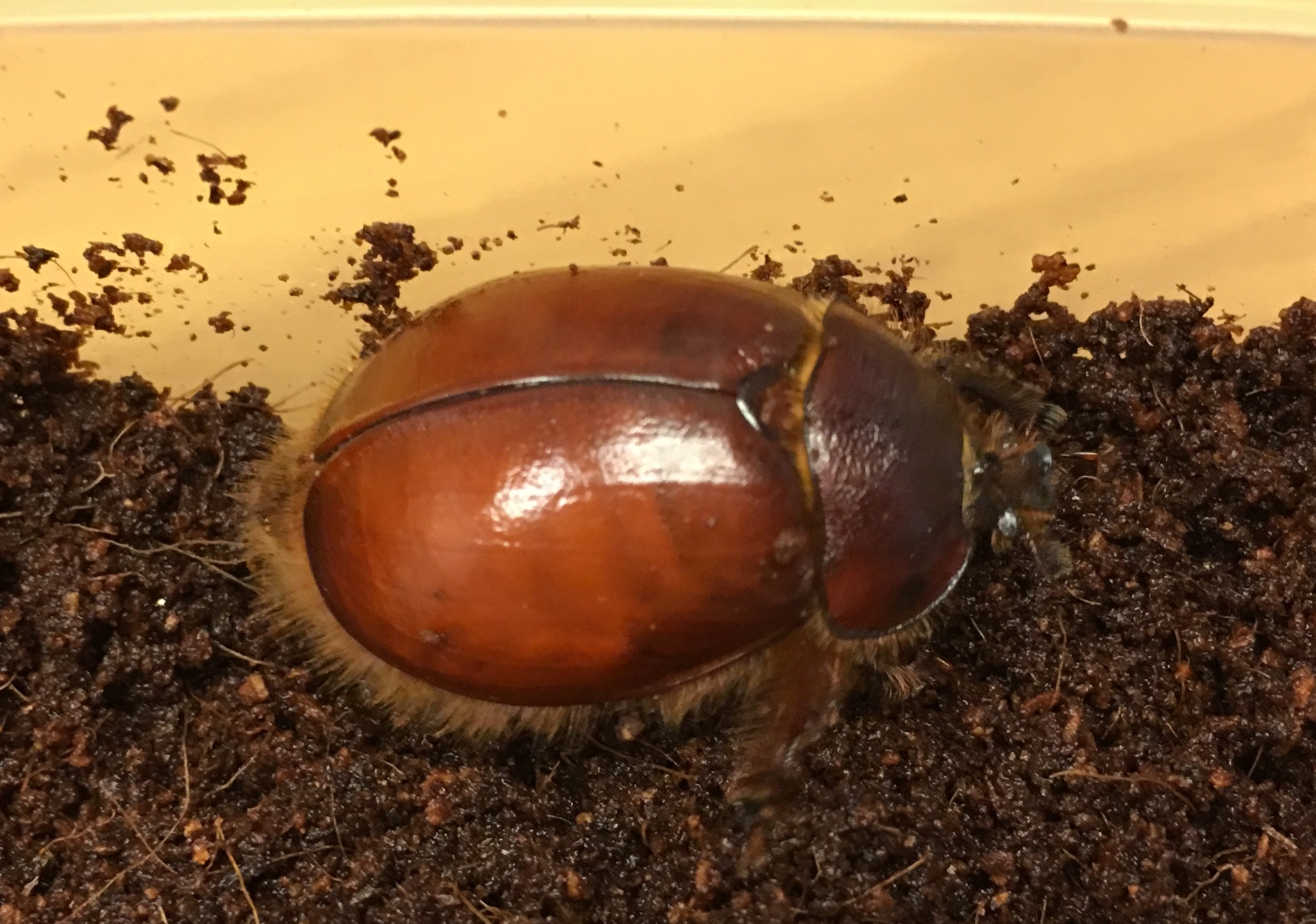
- Pleocoma octopagina, California

Scientific classification
- Domain: Eukaryota
- Kingdom: Animalia
- Phylum: Arthropoda
- Class: Insecta
- Order: Coleoptera
- Suborder: Polyphaga
- Infraorder: Scarabaeiformia
- Family: Pleocomidae
- Genus: Pleocoma
- Species: P. octopagina

Binomial name
- Pleocoma octopagina Robertson, 1970

= Pleocoma octopagina =

Species of beetle

Pleocoma octopagina is a species of rain beetle in the family Pleocomidae. It is found on the lower West Coast in North America.
