= Pleocoma conjungens =

Scientific classification
- Domain: Eukaryota
- Kingdom: Animalia
- Phylum: Arthropoda
- Class: Insecta
- Order: Coleoptera
- Suborder: Polyphaga
- Infraorder: Scarabaeiformia
- Family: Pleocomidae
- Genus: Pleocoma
- Species: P. conjungens

Binomial name
- Pleocoma conjungens Horn, 1888

Species of beetle

Pleocoma conjungens, the Santa Cruz rain beetle, is a species of rain beetle in the family Pleocomidae. It is found in North America.

== Subspecies ==
These two subspecies belong to the species Pleocoma conjungens:

- Pleocoma conjungens conjungens Horn, 1888 (Santa Cruz rain beetle)
- Pleocoma conjungens lucia Linsley, 1941
