= Stenosphenus rubidus =

Scientific classification
- Kingdom: Animalia
- Phylum: Arthropoda
- Clade: Pancrustacea
- Class: Insecta
- Order: Coleoptera
- Suborder: Polyphaga
- Infraorder: Cucujiformia
- Family: Cerambycidae
- Genus: Stenosphenus
- Species: S. rubidus

Binomial name
- Stenosphenus rubidus Linsley, 1935

Species of beetle

Stenosphenus rubidus is a species of beetle in the family Cerambycidae. It was first described by Earle Gorton Linsley in 1935.
