= Pleocoma rickseckeri =

Scientific classification
- Kingdom: Animalia
- Phylum: Arthropoda
- Class: Insecta
- Order: Coleoptera
- Suborder: Polyphaga
- Infraorder: Scarabaeiformia
- Family: Pleocomidae
- Genus: Pleocoma
- Species: P. rickseckeri

Binomial name
- Pleocoma rickseckeri Horn, 1888

Species of beetle

Pleocoma rickseckeri is a species of rain beetle in the family Pleocomidae. It is found in North America. It was named in honor of Lucius Edgar Ricksecker.

== See also ==
- Crambus rickseckerellus
