= Brachysomida vittigera =

Scientific classification
- Kingdom: Animalia
- Phylum: Arthropoda
- Class: Insecta
- Order: Coleoptera
- Suborder: Polyphaga
- Infraorder: Cucujiformia
- Family: Cerambycidae
- Genus: Brachysomida
- Species: B. vittigera

Binomial name
- Brachysomida vittigera Linsley & Chemsak, 1972

Synonyms
- Brachysomida corpulenta Hopping, 1943

Species of beetle

Brachysomida vittigera is the species of the Lepturinae subfamily in the long-horned beetle family. This beetle is distributed in United States.
