= Pleocoma tularensis =

Scientific classification
- Kingdom: Animalia
- Phylum: Arthropoda
- Class: Insecta
- Order: Coleoptera
- Suborder: Polyphaga
- Infraorder: Scarabaeiformia
- Family: Pleocomidae
- Genus: Pleocoma
- Species: P. tularensis

Binomial name
- Pleocoma tularensis Leach, 1933

Species of beetle

Pleocoma tularensis is a species of rain beetle in the family Pleocomidae. It is found in North America. This species has one of the most largest ranges in Pleocoma and is found across central and southern Sierra Nevada.

== Emergence Behavior ==
Rain beetles have been known to fly during twilight hours and under light precipitation, fog, or snowy conditions. It has long been assumed that the emerging adults are only active within a tightly constrained time window. This window occurs after the first instance of substantial rain signals the end of the summer drought. The window of activity may only be hours or days long.

One study of P. tularensis found that they emerged not on the first instance of rain, but during subsequent precipitation and declining temperatures after at least one inch of rain had accumulated. The beetles may have even waited weeks after the initial rainfall to emerge. This study also found that their window of activity was not so tightly constrained. Male P. tularensis were active for up to two months after they initially emerged and there were secondary flights during precipitation events three or four times in one season.
