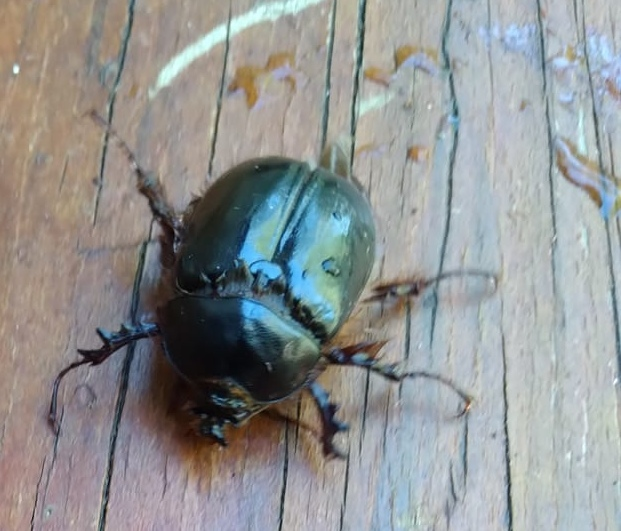
- Pleocoma australis, California

Scientific classification
- Domain: Eukaryota
- Kingdom: Animalia
- Phylum: Arthropoda
- Class: Insecta
- Order: Coleoptera
- Suborder: Polyphaga
- Infraorder: Scarabaeiformia
- Family: Pleocomidae
- Genus: Pleocoma
- Species: P. australis

Binomial name
- Pleocoma australis Fall, 1911

= Pleocoma australis =

Species of beetle

Pleocoma australis, the southern rain beetle, is a species of rain beetle in the family Pleocomidae. It is found in Southern California, United States.
