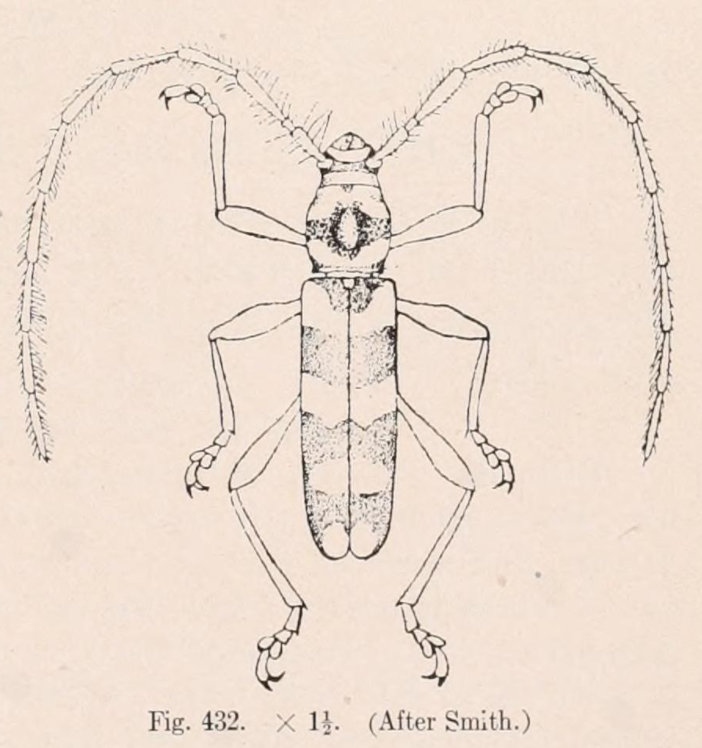
- D. sexnotatus.

Scientific classification
- Kingdom: Animalia
- Phylum: Arthropoda
- Class: Insecta
- Order: Coleoptera
- Suborder: Polyphaga
- Infraorder: Cucujiformia
- Family: Cerambycidae
- Tribe: Dryobiini
- Genus: Dryobius; LeConte, 1850
- Species: D. sexnotatus

Binomial name
- Dryobius sexnotatus Linsley, 1957

Synonyms
- Callidium 6-fasciatum Say, 1824, not Olivier, 1790; Dryobius 6-fasciatus LeConte, 1850; Dryobius sexfasciatus LeConte, 1859

= Dryobius =

Species of beetle

Dryobius sexnotatus is a species of beetle in the family Cerambycidae. It is the only species in the monospecific genus Dryobius.

== Taxonomic history ==
The species was initially described by Thomas Say, who named it Callidium 6-fasciatum. He placed it in the genus Callidium. In 1850, John Lawrence LeConte transferred the species to be the sole member of his newly-circumscribed genus Dryobius, making the name D. 6-fasciatus. LeConte emended the specific name from 6-fasciatus to sexfasciatus in 1859.

In 1957, Earle Gorton Linsley coined the nomen novum Dryobius sexnotatus for this species as there was already a senior homonym with the same specific name used by a beetle described by Guillaume-Antoine Olivier prior to Say's description.

The etymology of the generic name comes from the Greek words δρῦς tree and βιόω to live.

== Distribution ==
Most specimens of D. sexnotatus come from the Ohio River Valley, but it has been documented in at least fourteen states in the eastern United States.

== Biology ==
Its larvae eat maple, beech, basswood, and elm trees.

Its flight period ranges from early March through early September, but is most common from mid-June through mud-July.

The pheromones produced by males include 1-(1H–pyrrol-2-yl)-1,2-propanedione and (R)-3-hydroxyhexan-2-one.
