= Comacmaeops parva =

Scientific classification
- Kingdom: Animalia
- Phylum: Arthropoda
- Class: Insecta
- Order: Coleoptera
- Suborder: Polyphaga
- Infraorder: Cucujiformia
- Family: Cerambycidae
- Genus: Comacmaeops
- Species: C. parva

Binomial name
- Comacmaeops parva Linsley & Chemsak, 1972

Species of beetle

Comacmaeops parva is the species of the Lepturinae subfamily in the long-horned beetle family. This beetle is distributed in Mexico.
