= Pleocoma linsleyi =

Scientific classification
- Kingdom: Animalia
- Phylum: Arthropoda
- Clade: Pancrustacea
- Class: Insecta
- Order: Coleoptera
- Suborder: Polyphaga
- Infraorder: Scarabaeiformia
- Family: Pleocomidae
- Genus: Pleocoma
- Species: P. linsleyi

Binomial name
- Pleocoma linsleyi (Hovore, 1971)

Species of beetle

Pleocoma linsleyi is a beetle of the rain beetle family. It was named in honor of American entomologist Earle Gorton Linsley
