= Pleocoma badia =

Scientific classification
- Domain: Eukaryota
- Kingdom: Animalia
- Phylum: Arthropoda
- Class: Insecta
- Order: Coleoptera
- Suborder: Polyphaga
- Infraorder: Scarabaeiformia
- Family: Pleocomidae
- Genus: Pleocoma
- Species: P. badia

Binomial name
- Pleocoma badia Fall, 1917

Species of beetle

Pleocoma badia is a species of rain beetle in the family Pleocomidae. It is found in North America.

== Subspecies ==
These two subspecies belong to the species Pleocoma badia:

- Pleocoma badia badia Fall, 1917
- Pleocoma badia hirsuta Davis, 1934
