= Pleocoma rubiginosa =

Scientific classification
- Domain: Eukaryota
- Kingdom: Animalia
- Phylum: Arthropoda
- Class: Insecta
- Order: Coleoptera
- Suborder: Polyphaga
- Infraorder: Scarabaeiformia
- Family: Pleocomidae
- Genus: Pleocoma
- Species: P. rubiginosa

Binomial name
- Pleocoma rubiginosa Hovore, 1972

Species of beetle

Pleocoma rubiginosa is a species of rain beetle in the family Pleocomidae. It is found in North America.

== Subspecies ==
These two subspecies belong to the species Pleocoma rubiginosa:

- Pleocoma rubiginosa rubiginosa Hovore, 1972
- Pleocoma rubiginosa transsierrae Hovore, 1972
