= Amannus atriplicis =

Scientific classification
- Kingdom: Animalia
- Phylum: Arthropoda
- Clade: Pancrustacea
- Class: Insecta
- Order: Coleoptera
- Suborder: Polyphaga
- Infraorder: Cucujiformia
- Family: Cerambycidae
- Genus: Amannus
- Species: A. atriplicis

Binomial name
- Amannus atriplicis Linsley, 1957

Species of beetle

Amannus atriplicis is a species of beetle in the family Cerambycidae. It was described by Linsley in 1957.
