= Pleocoma staff =

Scientific classification
- Domain: Eukaryota
- Kingdom: Animalia
- Phylum: Arthropoda
- Class: Insecta
- Order: Coleoptera
- Suborder: Polyphaga
- Infraorder: Scarabaeiformia
- Family: Pleocomidae
- Genus: Pleocoma
- Species: P. staff

Binomial name
- Pleocoma staff Schaufuss, 1870

Synonyms
- Pleocoma adjuvans Crotch, 1873; Pleocoma edwardsii LeConte, 1874; Pleocoma ulkei Horn, 1888

Species of beetle

Pleocoma staff is a species of rain beetle in the family Pleocomidae. It is found in North America.
