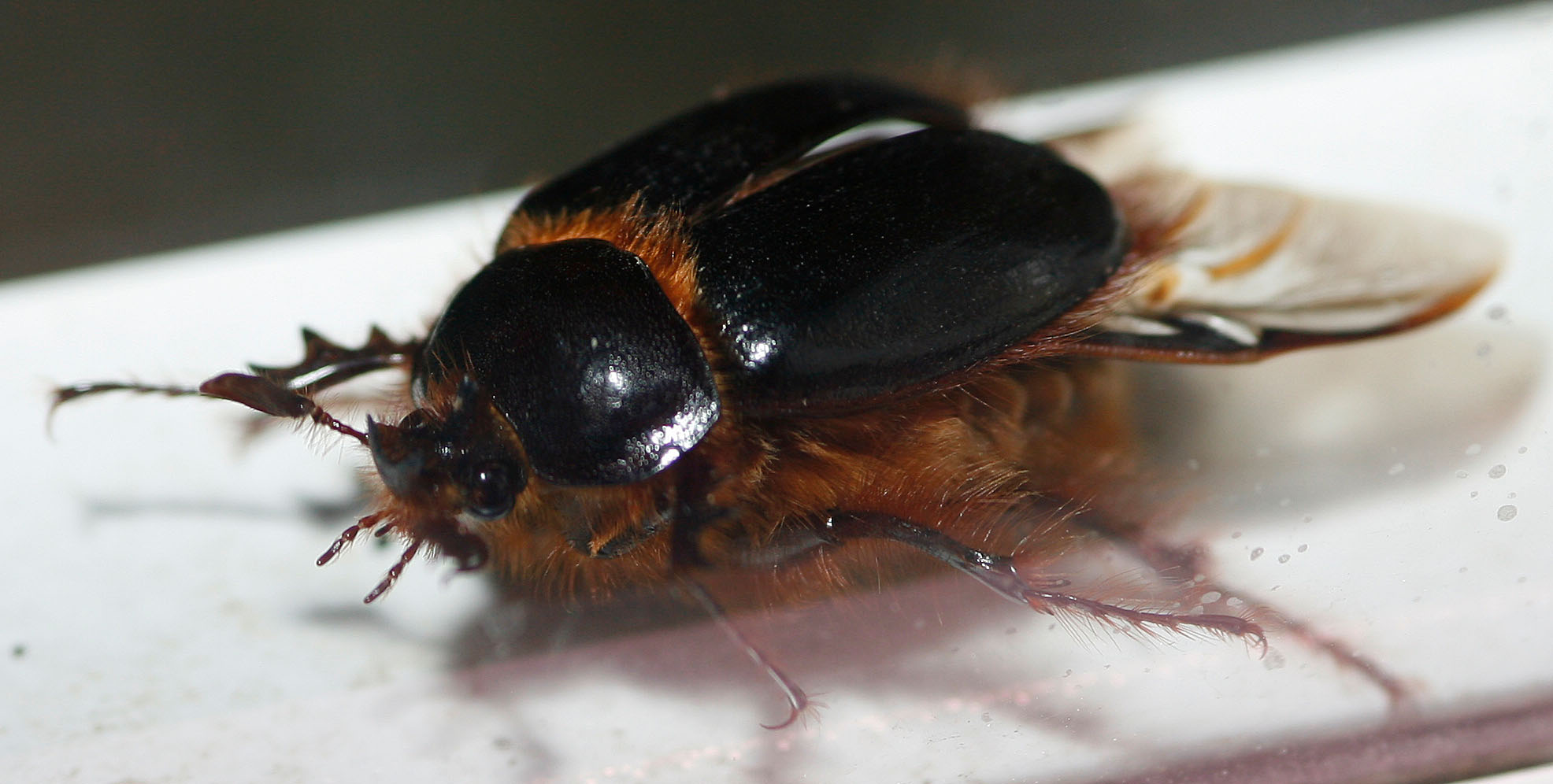
- Pleocoma sp.

Scientific classification
- Kingdom: Animalia
- Phylum: Arthropoda
- Class: Insecta
- Order: Coleoptera
- Suborder: Polyphaga
- Infraorder: Scarabaeiformia
- Family: Pleocomidae
- Genus: Pleocoma; LeConte, 1856

= Pleocoma =

Genus of beetles

Pleocoma is the only extant genus of rain beetles (family Pleocomidae) and is endemic to the Pacific states of North America. Fossil remains of Pleocoma have been found in the Yixian Formation in China, suggesting beetles in this genus have existed in something like their present form since at least the Cretaceous period. There are 27 described species in Pleocoma.

Possessing a robust oval body form similar to other scarabaeiforms, their ventral side is densely covered with fine, long hairs (genus name derives from Greek πλείων (ple-, abundant) and κόμη (kome, hair), extending to the legs and to the margins of thorax and elytra. The back is hairless and glossy. Overall colors range from black to a reddish-brown, while the hairs may range from yellow to red to black. The antennae are 11-segmented, with a club of four to eight lamellae, more than in any other group of the Scarabaeoidea. The mandibles are not functional, and the opening into the esophagus is closed off; adults do not eat.

Larvae have the typical scarabaeiform characteristics, C-shaped bodies generally a creamy white. They feed on roots in the soil, often deep beneath the host plant. Details of the larval stage are only known for some species; they have nine or more instars, and may take up to 13 years to mature. After a late summer pupation, adults of both sexes dig their way to the surface, emerging around the onset of the fall/winter rainy season typical of, for instance, California's climate; some species are active as late as early spring. Females have only vestigial wings, so the males fly around (often while it is raining), homing in on pheromones released by the females. They mate on the surface or in a burrow dug out by the female, then the female lays eggs in the bottom of the burrow. The "triggering" conditions required for some species to fly are so stringent that a given population may only be active for a single day in a given year. Males are commonly attracted to bright lights.

== Species ==
- Pleocoma australis Fall, 1911 (southern rain beetle)
- Pleocoma badia Fall, 1917
- Pleocoma behrensii LeConte, 1874
- Pleocoma bicolor Linsley, 1935
- Pleocoma blaisdelli Linsley, 1938
- Pleocoma carinata Linsley, 1938
- Pleocoma conjungens Horn, 1888 (Santa Cruz rain beetle)
- Pleocoma crinita Linsley, 1938
- Pleocoma dubitabilis Davis, 1935
- Pleocoma fimbriata Leconte, 1856
- Pleocoma hirticollis Schaufuss, 1870
- Pleocoma hoppingi Fall, 1906
- Pleocoma hovorei La Rue, 2007
- Pleocoma linsleyi Hovore, 1971
- Pleocoma marquai Hovore, 1972
- Pleocoma minor Linsley, 1938
- Pleocoma octopagina Robertson, 1970
- Pleocoma oregonensis Leach, 1933
- Pleocoma puncticollis Rivers, 1889 (black rain beetle)
- Pleocoma rickseckeri Horn, 1888
- Pleocoma rubiginosa Hovore, 1972
- Pleocoma shastensis Van Dyke, 1933
- Pleocoma simi Davis, 1934
- Pleocoma sonomae Linsley, 1935
- Pleocoma staff Schaufuss, 1870
- Pleocoma trifoliata Linsley, 1938
- Pleocoma tularensis Leach, 1933

== Fossil species ==
- †Pleocoma dolichophylla Nikolajev & Ren, 2012
