= Pleocoma blaisdelli =

Scientific classification
- Domain: Eukaryota
- Kingdom: Animalia
- Phylum: Arthropoda
- Class: Insecta
- Order: Coleoptera
- Suborder: Polyphaga
- Infraorder: Scarabaeiformia
- Family: Pleocomidae
- Genus: Pleocoma
- Species: P. blaisdelli

Binomial name
- Pleocoma blaisdelli Linsley, 1938

Species of beetle

Pleocoma blaisdelli is a species of rain beetle in the family Pleocomidae. It is found in North America.
