= Crossidius discoideus =

Scientific classification
- Domain: Eukaryota
- Kingdom: Animalia
- Phylum: Arthropoda
- Class: Insecta
- Order: Coleoptera
- Suborder: Polyphaga
- Infraorder: Cucujiformia
- Family: Cerambycidae
- Genus: Crossidius
- Species: C. discoideus

Binomial name
- Crossidius discoideus (Say, 1824)

Species of beetle

Crossidius discoideus is a species of beetle in the family Cerambycidae. It was described by say in 1824.
