= Amannus =

Scientific classification
- Domain: Eukaryota
- Kingdom: Animalia
- Phylum: Arthropoda
- Class: Insecta
- Order: Coleoptera
- Suborder: Polyphaga
- Infraorder: Cucujiformia
- Family: Cerambycidae
- Subfamily: Cerambycinae
- Tribe: Trachyderini
- Genus: Amannus; LeConte, 1858

Genus of beetles

Amannus is a genus of beetles in the family Cerambycidae, containing the following species:

- Amannus atriplicis Linsley, 1957
- Amannus pectoralis LeConte, 1858
- Amannus vittiger LeConte, 1858
