= Stenosphenus langurioides =

Scientific classification
- Domain: Eukaryota
- Kingdom: Animalia
- Phylum: Arthropoda
- Class: Insecta
- Order: Coleoptera
- Suborder: Polyphaga
- Infraorder: Cucujiformia
- Family: Cerambycidae
- Genus: Stenosphenus
- Species: S. langurioides

Binomial name
- Stenosphenus langurioides Bates, 1885

Species of beetle

Stenosphenus langurioides is a species of beetle in the family Cerambycidae. It was described by Bates in 1885.
