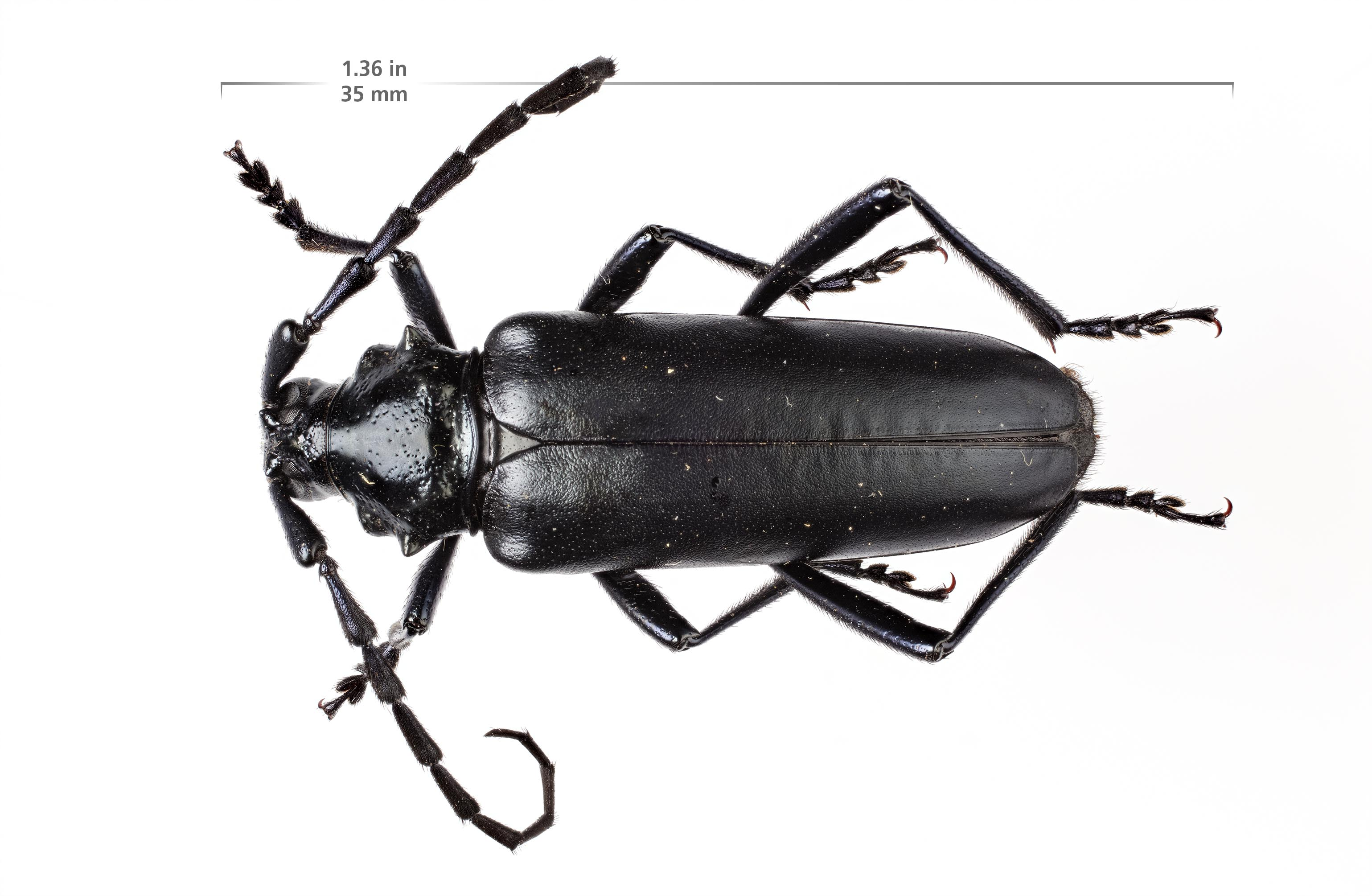

Scientific classification
- Kingdom: Animalia
- Phylum: Arthropoda
- Class: Insecta
- Order: Coleoptera
- Suborder: Polyphaga
- Infraorder: Cucujiformia
- Family: Cerambycidae
- Subfamily: Cerambycinae
- Tribe: Trachyderini
- Subtribe: Trachyderina
- Genus: Crossidius; LeConte, 1851

= Crossidius =

Genus of beetles

Crossidius is a genus of beetles in the family Cerambycidae.

Containing the following species:

- Crossidius ater LeConte, 1861
- Crossidius coralinus LeConte, 1862
- Crossidius discoideus (Say, 1824)
- Crossidius grahami Morris & Wappes, 2013
- Crossidius hirtipes LeConte, 1854
- Crossidius humeralis LeConte, 1858
- Crossidius hurdi Chemsak & Linsley, 1959
- Crossidius mexicanus Chemsak & Noguera, 1997
- Crossidius militaris Bates, 1892
- Crossidius mojavensis Linsley, 1955
- Crossidius pulchellus LeConte, 1861
- Crossidius punctatus LeConte, 1873
- Crossidius suturalis LeConte, 1858
- Crossidius testaceus LeConte, 1851
