= Tetropium pilosicorne =

Scientific classification
- Kingdom: Animalia
- Phylum: Arthropoda
- Class: Insecta
- Order: Coleoptera
- Suborder: Polyphaga
- Infraorder: Cucujiformia
- Family: Cerambycidae
- Genus: Tetropium
- Species: T. pilosicorne

Binomial name
- Tetropium pilosicorne Linsley, 1935

Species of beetle

Tetropium pilosicorne is a species of beetle in the family Cerambycidae. It was described by Linsley in 1935.
