= Neotaranomis atropurpurea =

Scientific classification
- Domain: Eukaryota
- Kingdom: Animalia
- Phylum: Arthropoda
- Class: Insecta
- Order: Coleoptera
- Suborder: Polyphaga
- Infraorder: Cucujiformia
- Family: Cerambycidae
- Genus: Neotaranomis
- Species: N. atropurpurea

Binomial name
- Neotaranomis atropurpurea Chemsak & Noguera, 2001

Species of beetle

Neotaranomis atropurpurea is a species of beetle in the family Cerambycidae. It was described by Chemsak & Noguera in 2001.
