= Comacmaeops =

Scientific classification
- Kingdom: Animalia
- Phylum: Arthropoda
- Class: Insecta
- Order: Coleoptera
- Suborder: Polyphaga
- Infraorder: Cucujiformia
- Family: Cerambycidae
- Subfamily: Lepturinae
- Tribe: Rhagiini
- Genus: Comacmaeops; Linsley & Chemsak, 1972

Genus of beetles

Comacmaeops is a genus of beetles in the family Cerambycidae, containing the following species:

- Comacmaeops brunnea (Knull, 1962)
- Comacmaeops parva Linsley & Chemsak, 1972
