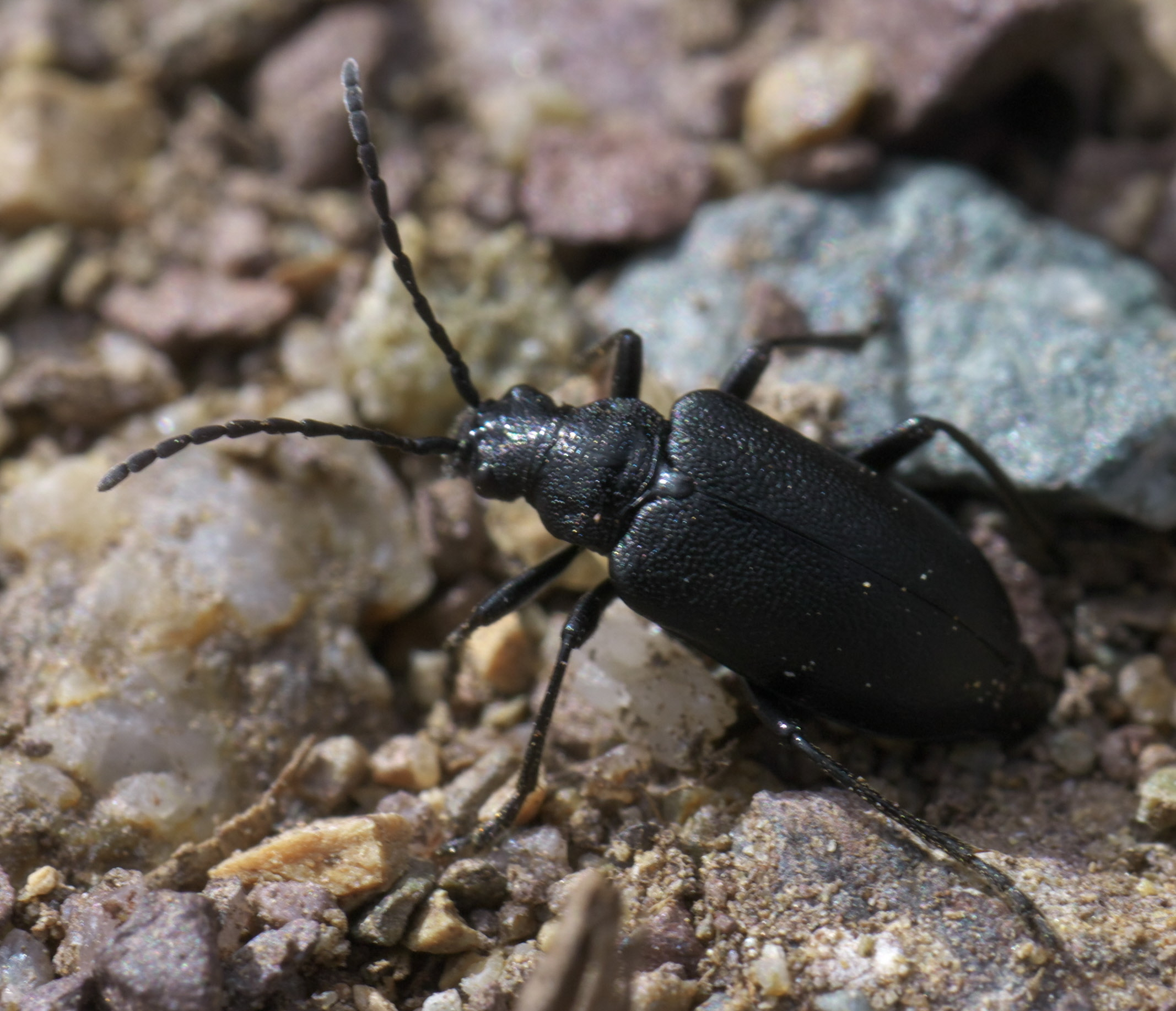
- Brachysomida atra

Scientific classification
- Kingdom: Animalia
- Phylum: Arthropoda
- Class: Insecta
- Order: Coleoptera
- Suborder: Polyphaga
- Infraorder: Cucujiformia
- Family: Cerambycidae
- Tribe: Rhagiini
- Genus: Brachysomida; Casey, 1913

= Brachysomida =

Genus of beetles

Brachysomida is a genus of beetles in the family Cerambycidae, containing the following species:

- Brachysomida atra (LeConte, 1850)
- Brachysomida bivittata (Say, 1824)
- Brachysomida californica (LeConte, 1851)
- Brachysomida rugicollis Linsley & Chemsak, 1972
- Brachysomida vittigera Linsley & Chemsak, 1972
