= Crossidius hurdi =

Scientific classification
- Domain: Eukaryota
- Kingdom: Animalia
- Phylum: Arthropoda
- Class: Insecta
- Order: Coleoptera
- Suborder: Polyphaga
- Infraorder: Cucujiformia
- Family: Cerambycidae
- Genus: Crossidius
- Species: C. hurdi

Binomial name
- Crossidius hurdi Chemsak & Linsley, 1959

Species of beetle

Crossidius hurdi is a species of beetle in the family Cerambycidae. It was described by Chemsak & Linsley in 1959.
