= Lamacoscylus bivittatus =

Scientific classification
- Kingdom: Animalia
- Phylum: Arthropoda
- Class: Insecta
- Order: Coleoptera
- Suborder: Polyphaga
- Infraorder: Cucujiformia
- Family: Cerambycidae
- Genus: Lamacoscylus
- Species: L. bivittatus

Binomial name
- Lamacoscylus bivittatus (Gahan, 1892)

Species of beetle

Lamacoscylus bivittatus is a species of beetle in the family Cerambycidae. It was described by Charles Joseph Gahan in 1892. It is known from Mexico.
