= Crossidius mexicanus =

Scientific classification
- Domain: Eukaryota
- Kingdom: Animalia
- Phylum: Arthropoda
- Class: Insecta
- Order: Coleoptera
- Suborder: Polyphaga
- Infraorder: Cucujiformia
- Family: Cerambycidae
- Genus: Crossidius
- Species: C. mexicanus

Binomial name
- Crossidius mexicanus Chemsak & Noguera, 1997

Species of beetle

Crossidius mexicanus is a species of beetle in the family Cerambycidae. It was described by Chemsak & Noguera in 1997.
