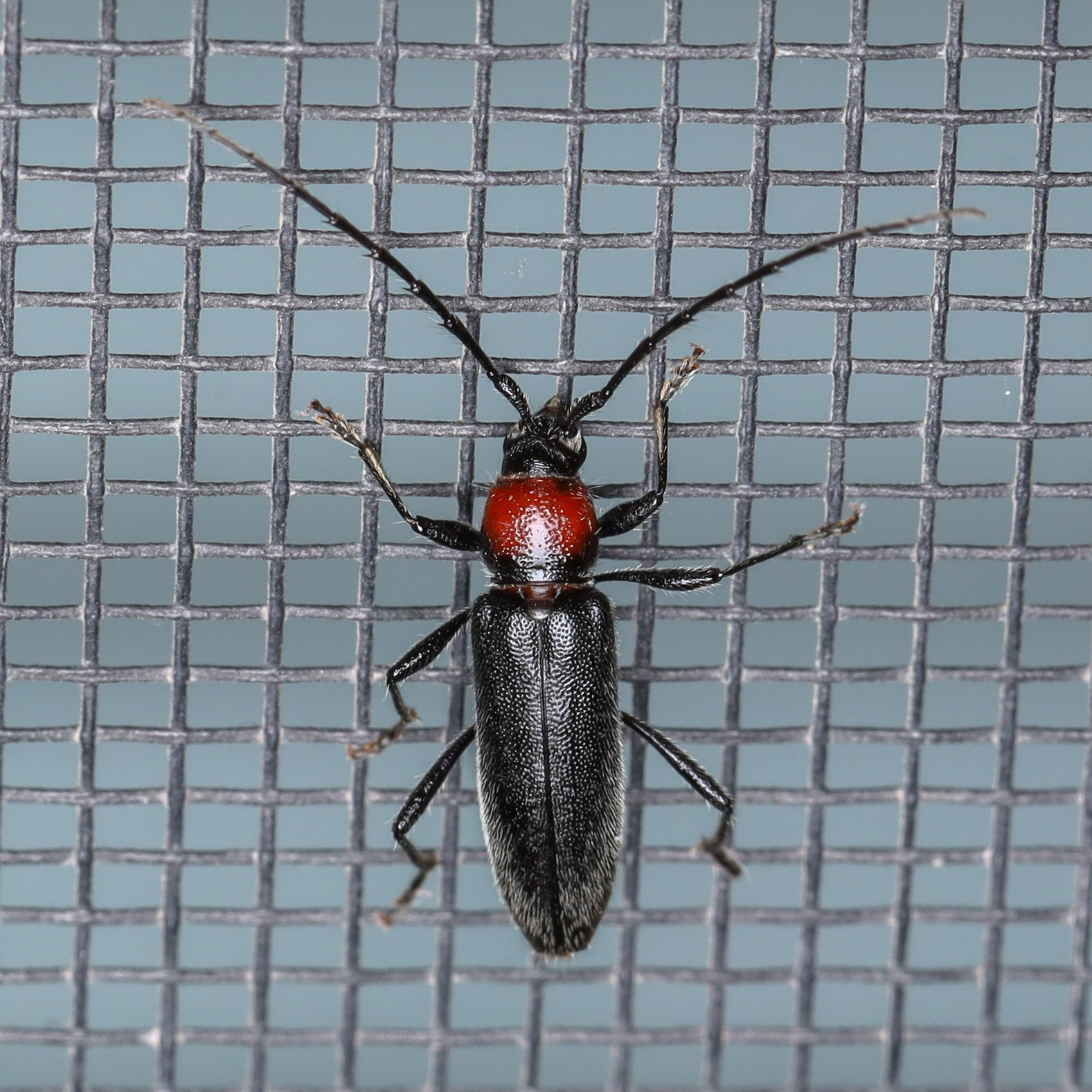

Scientific classification
- Kingdom: Animalia
- Phylum: Arthropoda
- Class: Insecta
- Order: Coleoptera
- Suborder: Polyphaga
- Infraorder: Cucujiformia
- Family: Cerambycidae
- Genus: Stenosphenus
- Species: S. beyeri

Binomial name
- Stenosphenus beyeri Schaeffer, 1905

= Stenosphenus beyeri =

Species of beetle

Stenosphenus beyeri is a species of beetle in the family Cerambycidae. It was first described by Schaeffer in 1905.
