= Stenosphenus proruber =

Scientific classification
- Domain: Eukaryota
- Kingdom: Animalia
- Phylum: Arthropoda
- Class: Insecta
- Order: Coleoptera
- Suborder: Polyphaga
- Infraorder: Cucujiformia
- Family: Cerambycidae
- Genus: Stenosphenus
- Species: S. proruber

Binomial name
- Stenosphenus proruber Giesbert & Chemsak, 1989

Species of beetle

Stenosphenus proruber is a species of beetle in the family Cerambycidae. It was described by Giesbert and Chemsak in 1989.
