= Amannus pectoralis =

Scientific classification
- Kingdom: Animalia
- Phylum: Arthropoda
- Class: Insecta
- Order: Coleoptera
- Suborder: Polyphaga
- Infraorder: Cucujiformia
- Family: Cerambycidae
- Genus: Amannus
- Species: A. pectoralis

Binomial name
- Amannus pectoralis LeConte, 1858

Species of beetle

Amannus pectoralis is a species of beetle in the family Cerambycidae, first described by John Lawrence LeConte in 1858.
