= Neotaranomis =

- Neotaranomis sinaloae

Scientific classification
- Kingdom: Animalia
- Phylum: Arthropoda
- Clade: Pancrustacea
- Class: Insecta
- Order: Coleoptera
- Suborder: Polyphaga
- Infraorder: Cucujiformia
- Family: Cerambycidae
- Subfamily: Cerambycinae
- Tribe: Trachyderini
- Genus: Neotaranomis; Chemsak & Linsley, 1982

Genus of beetles

Neotaranomis is a genus of beetles in the family Cerambycidae, containing the following species:

- Neotaranomis atropurpurea Chemsak & Noguera, 2001
- Neotaranomis australis Chemsak & Linsley, 1982
- Neotaranomis sinaloae Chemsak & Linsley, 1982
