= Crossidius militaris =

Scientific classification
- Domain: Eukaryota
- Kingdom: Animalia
- Phylum: Arthropoda
- Class: Insecta
- Order: Coleoptera
- Suborder: Polyphaga
- Infraorder: Cucujiformia
- Family: Cerambycidae
- Genus: Crossidius
- Species: C. militaris

Binomial name
- Crossidius militaris Bates, 1892

Species of beetle

Crossidius militaris is a species of beetle in the family Cerambycidae. It was described by Henry Walter Bates in 1892.
