= Comacmaeops brunnea =

Scientific classification
- Kingdom: Animalia
- Phylum: Arthropoda
- Clade: Pancrustacea
- Class: Insecta
- Order: Coleoptera
- Suborder: Polyphaga
- Infraorder: Cucujiformia
- Family: Cerambycidae
- Genus: Comacmaeops
- Species: C. brunnea

Binomial name
- Comacmaeops brunnea (Knull, 1962)

Synonyms
- Brachysomida brunnea Knull, 1962

Species of beetle

Comacmaeops brunnea is the species of the Lepturinae subfamily in the long-horned beetle family. This beetle is distributed in United States.
