= Lamacoscylus =

Scientific classification
- Kingdom: Animalia
- Phylum: Arthropoda
- Class: Insecta
- Order: Coleoptera
- Suborder: Polyphaga
- Infraorder: Cucujiformia
- Family: Cerambycidae
- Subfamily: Lamiinae
- Tribe: Hemilophini
- Genus: Lamacoscylus; Martins & Galileo, 1991

Genus of beetles

Lamacoscylus is a genus of longhorn beetles of the subfamily Lamiinae, containing the following species:

- Lamacoscylus bivittatus (Gahan, 1892)
- Lamacoscylus humilis (Bates, 1881)
- Lamacoscylus usingeri (Linsley, 1935)
