= Stenosphenus dolosus =

Scientific classification
- Domain: Eukaryota
- Kingdom: Animalia
- Phylum: Arthropoda
- Class: Insecta
- Order: Coleoptera
- Suborder: Polyphaga
- Infraorder: Cucujiformia
- Family: Cerambycidae
- Genus: Stenosphenus
- Species: S. dolosus

Binomial name
- Stenosphenus dolosus Horn, 1885

Species of beetle

Stenosphenus dolosus is a species of beetle in the family Cerambycidae. It was described by George Henry Horn in 1885.
