= Pleocoma carinata =

Scientific classification
- Domain: Eukaryota
- Kingdom: Animalia
- Phylum: Arthropoda
- Class: Insecta
- Order: Coleoptera
- Suborder: Polyphaga
- Infraorder: Scarabaeiformia
- Family: Pleocomidae
- Genus: Pleocoma
- Species: P. carinata

Binomial name
- Pleocoma carinata Linsley, 1938

Species of beetle

Pleocoma carinata is a species of rain beetle in the family Pleocomidae. It is found in North America.
