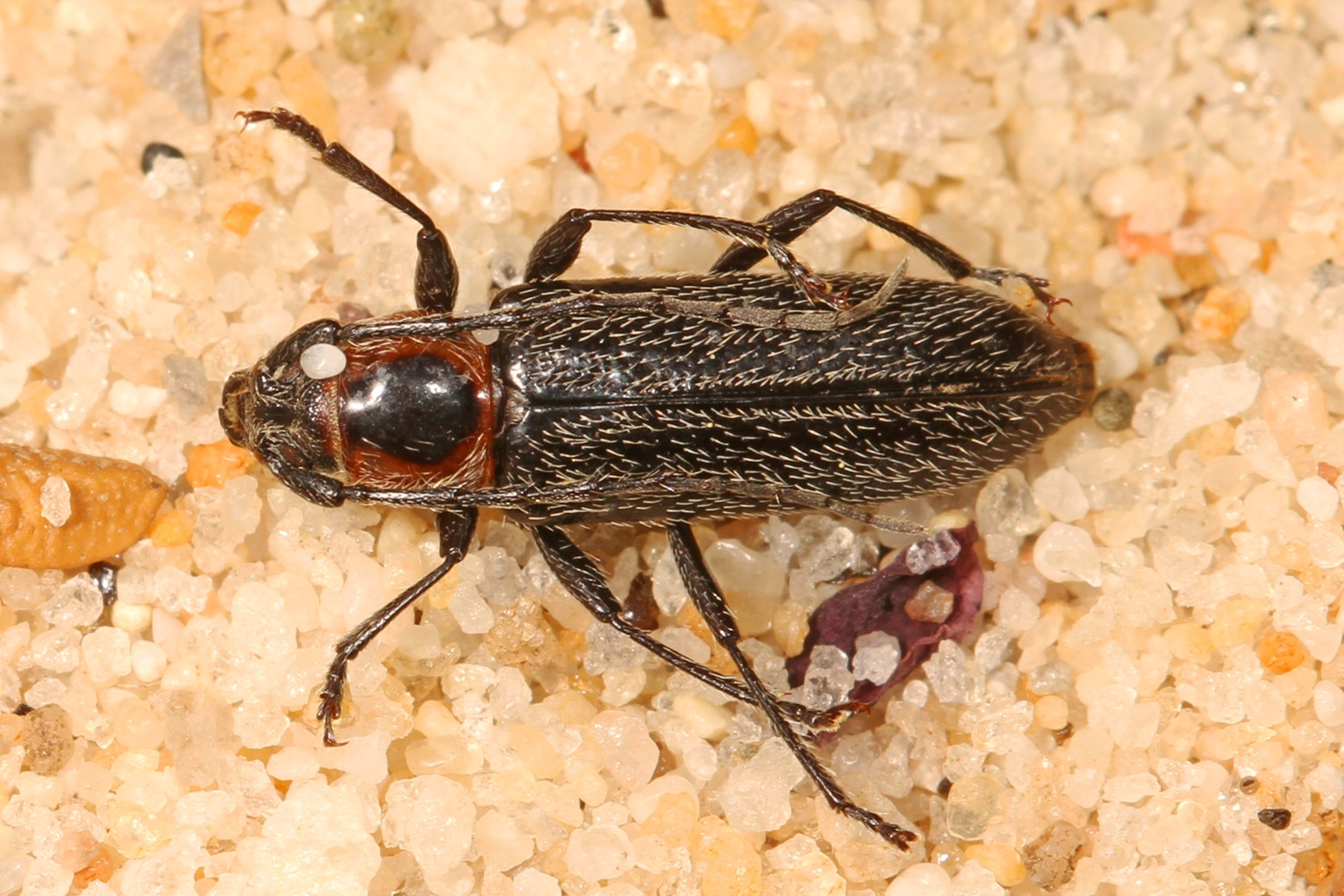

Scientific classification
- Kingdom: Animalia
- Phylum: Arthropoda
- Clade: Pancrustacea
- Class: Insecta
- Order: Coleoptera
- Suborder: Polyphaga
- Infraorder: Cucujiformia
- Family: Cerambycidae
- Genus: Stenosphenus
- Species: S. notatus

Binomial name
- Stenosphenus notatus (Olivier, 1795)

= Stenosphenus notatus =

Species of beetle

Stenosphenus notatus is a species of beetle in the family Cerambycidae. It was described by Guillaume-Antoine Olivier in 1795. Larvae of the species breed in dead limbs of Carya species, and occasionally Celtis.
