= Stenosphenus insulicola =

Scientific classification
- Domain: Eukaryota
- Kingdom: Animalia
- Phylum: Arthropoda
- Class: Insecta
- Order: Coleoptera
- Suborder: Polyphaga
- Infraorder: Cucujiformia
- Family: Cerambycidae
- Genus: Stenosphenus
- Species: S. insulicola

Binomial name
- Stenosphenus insulicola Fisher, 1942

Species of beetle

Stenosphenus insulicola is a species of beetle in the family Cerambycidae. It was described by Fisher in 1942.
