= Brachysomida rugicollis =

Scientific classification
- Kingdom: Animalia
- Phylum: Arthropoda
- Clade: Pancrustacea
- Class: Insecta
- Order: Coleoptera
- Suborder: Polyphaga
- Infraorder: Cucujiformia
- Family: Cerambycidae
- Genus: Brachysomida
- Species: B. rugicollis

Binomial name
- Brachysomida rugicollis Linsley & Chemsak, 1972

Species of beetle

Brachysomida rugicollis is the species of the Lepturinae subfamily in long-horned beetle family. This beetle is distributed in United States.
