= Brachysomida bivittata =

Scientific classification
- Kingdom: Animalia
- Phylum: Arthropoda
- Clade: Pancrustacea
- Class: Insecta
- Order: Coleoptera
- Suborder: Polyphaga
- Infraorder: Cucujiformia
- Family: Cerambycidae
- Genus: Brachysomida
- Species: B. bivittata

Binomial name
- Brachysomida bivittata (Say, 1824)

Synonyms
- Acmaeops bivittata Aurivillius, 1912; Acmaeops bivittatus Say, 1824; Acmaeops incerta Gemminger & Harold, 1873; Acmaeops oblongus Hopping, 1928; Gaurotes bivittatus Casey, 1913; Gaurotes fusciceps Casey, 1913; Gaurotes nigripennis Casey, 1913; Gaurotes oblongus Casey, 1913; Leptura bivittata Say, 1824

Species of beetle

Brachysomida bivittata is the species of the Lepturinae subfamily in longhorn beetle family. The beetle is distributed in Canada, and Nebraska, United States.

The species is between 7-11 millimeter long.

== Subtaxons ==
There are three varietets in species:

- Brachysomida bivittata var. fusciceps (LeConte, 1850)
- Brachysomida bivittata var. nigripennis (LeConte, 1850)
- Brachysomida bivittata var. varians (LeConte, 1850)
