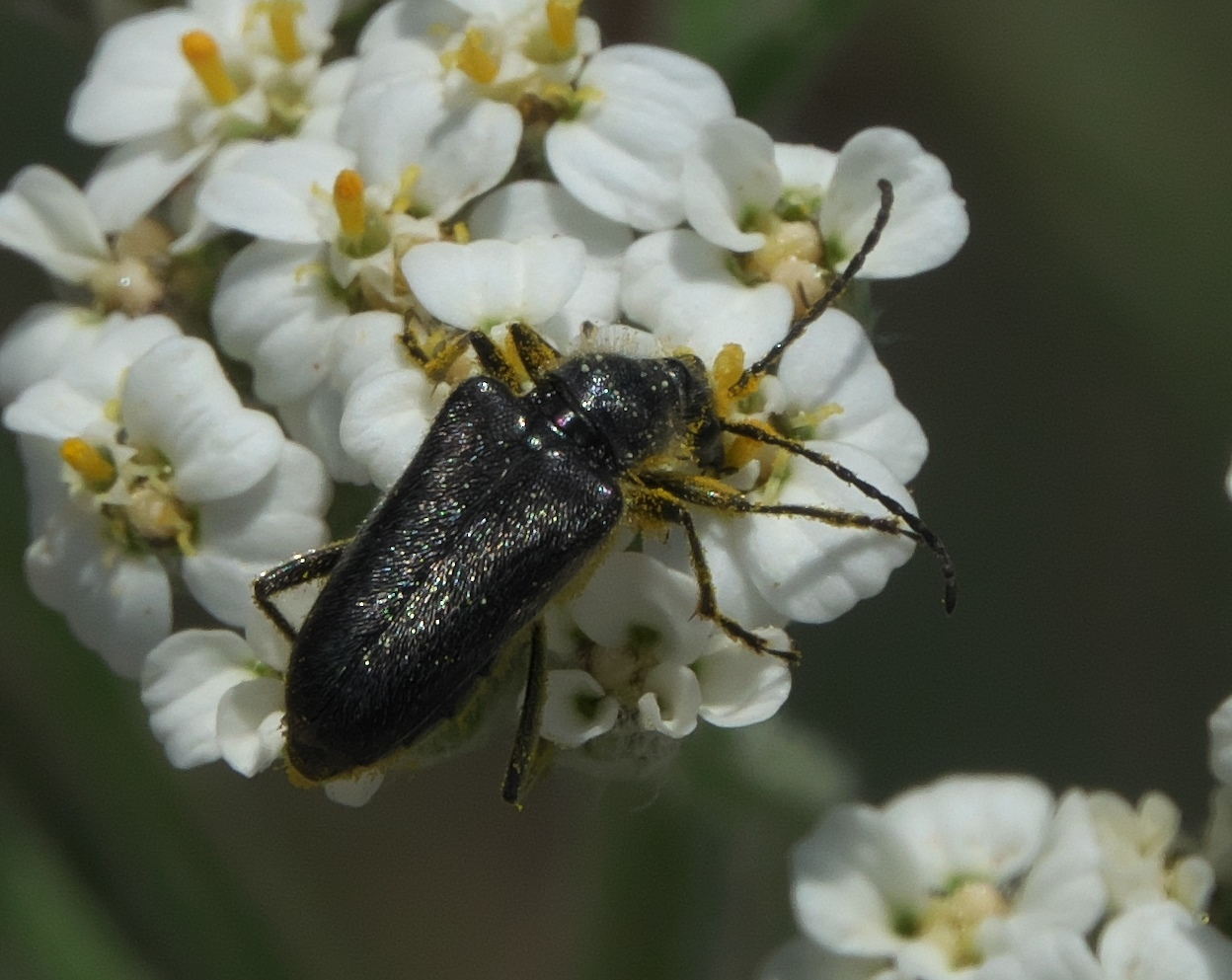
- Brachysomida californica, California

Scientific classification
- Kingdom: Animalia
- Phylum: Arthropoda
- Class: Insecta
- Order: Coleoptera
- Suborder: Polyphaga
- Infraorder: Cucujiformia
- Family: Cerambycidae
- Genus: Brachysomida
- Species: B. californica

Binomial name
- Brachysomida californica (LeConte, 1851)

Synonyms
- Acmaeops californica (LeConte) Aurivillius, 1912; Acmaeops lugens LeConte, 1857; Acmaeops pinguis Aurivillius, 1912; Acmaeops subaeneus Melsheimer, 1853; Brachysomida brevicornis Casey, 1913; Brachysomida caerulea Casey, 1913; Brachysomida caerulea chalybea Casey, 1913; Brachysomida californica francisca Casey, 1924; Brachysomida californica proxima Casey, 1913; Brachysomida celestina Casey, 1913; Brachysomida corpulenta Casey, 1913; Brachysomida francisca Casey, 1913; Brachysomida hirsuta Casey, 1913; Brachysomida lanatula Casey, 1913; Brachysomida lepidula Casey, 1913; Brachysomida lugens Casey, 1913; Brachysomida pinguis Casey, 1913; Brachysomida protensicollis Casey, 1913; Brachysomida robustula Casey, 1913; Brachysomida subaenea (Melsheimer) Casey, 1913; Brachysomida trinitatis Casey, 1913; Brachysomida tumida Casey, 1913; Brachysomida tumidiceps Casey, 1913; Brachysomida versicolor Casey, 1913; Leptura californica (LeConte) Fall, 1901; Acmaeops californicus LeConte, 1851

= Brachysomida californica =

Species of beetle

Brachysomida californica is a species of long-horned beetle in the subfamily Lepturinae from western North America. It was described by John Lawrence LeConte in 1851 from the Santa Cruz Mountains in California.
