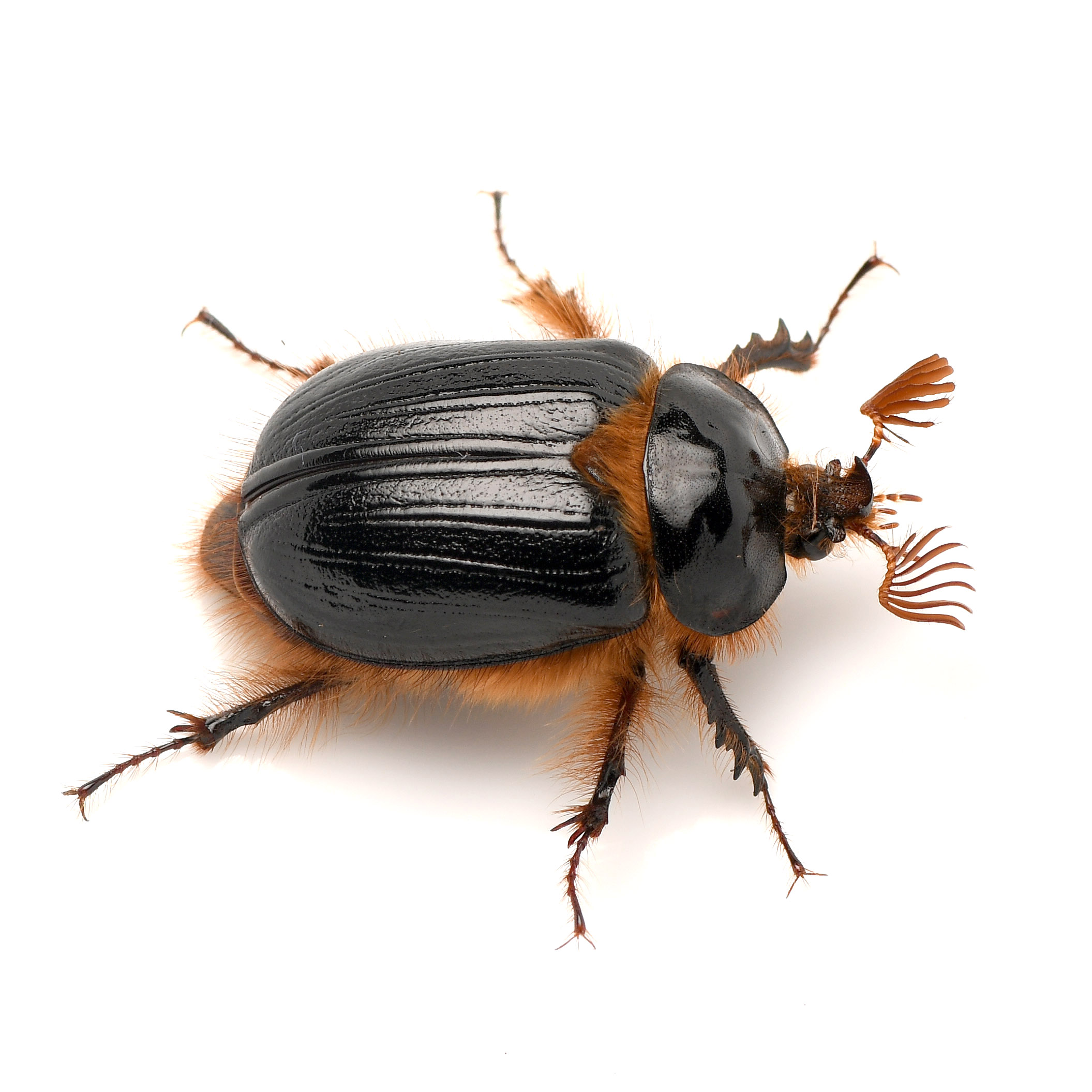
- Pleocoma dubitabilis dubitabilis

Scientific classification
- Kingdom: Animalia
- Phylum: Arthropoda
- Class: Insecta
- Order: Coleoptera
- Suborder: Polyphaga
- Infraorder: Scarabaeiformia
- Family: Pleocomidae
- Genus: Pleocoma
- Species: P. dubitabilis

Binomial name
- Pleocoma dubitabilis Davis, 1935

= Pleocoma dubitabilis =

Species of beetle

Pleocoma dubitabilis is a species of rain beetle in the family Pleocomidae. It is found in North America.

== Subspecies ==
These two subspecies belong to the species Pleocoma dubitabilis:

- Pleocoma dubitabilis dubitabilis Davis, 1935
- Pleocoma dubitabilis leachi Linsley, 1938
