= Pleocoma hirticollis =

Scientific classification
- Domain: Eukaryota
- Kingdom: Animalia
- Phylum: Arthropoda
- Class: Insecta
- Order: Coleoptera
- Suborder: Polyphaga
- Infraorder: Scarabaeiformia
- Family: Pleocomidae
- Genus: Pleocoma
- Species: P. hirticollis

Binomial name
- Pleocoma hirticollis Schaufuss, 1870

Species of beetle

Pleocoma hirticollis is a species of rain beetle in the family Pleocomidae. It is found in North America.

== Subspecies ==
These three subspecies belong to the species Pleocoma hirticollis:

- Pleocoma hirticollis hirticollis Schaufuss, 1870
- Pleocoma hirticollis reflexa Hovore, 1972
- Pleocoma hirticollis vandykei Linsley, 1938
