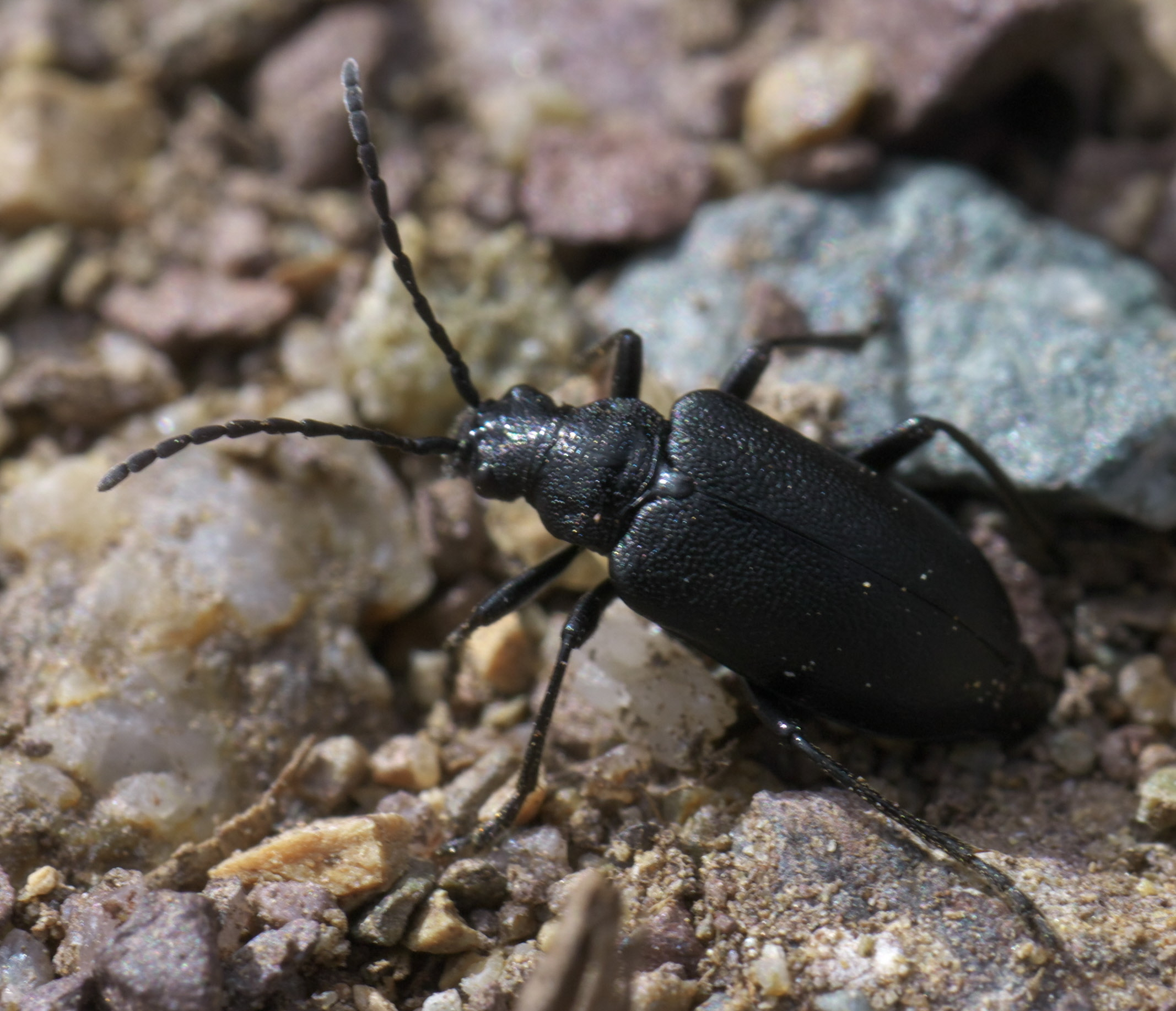

Scientific classification
- Kingdom: Animalia
- Phylum: Arthropoda
- Class: Insecta
- Order: Coleoptera
- Suborder: Polyphaga
- Infraorder: Cucujiformia
- Family: Cerambycidae
- Genus: Brachysomida
- Species: B. atra

Binomial name
- Brachysomida atra (LeConte, 1850)

Synonyms
- Acmaeops ater LeConte, 1850; Acmaeops atra Gemminger & Harold, 1872; Brachysomida aterrima Casey, 1924; Brachysomida morata Casey, 1913

= Brachysomida atra =

Species of beetle

Brachysomida atra is a species of insect in the longhorn beetle family. It was described by John Lawrence LeConte in 1850 and is distributed in Alberta, Canada, and the United States.
