= Neotaranomis australis =

Scientific classification
- Domain: Eukaryota
- Kingdom: Animalia
- Phylum: Arthropoda
- Class: Insecta
- Order: Coleoptera
- Suborder: Polyphaga
- Infraorder: Cucujiformia
- Family: Cerambycidae
- Genus: Neotaranomis
- Species: N. australis

Binomial name
- Neotaranomis australis Chemsak & Linsley, 1982

Species of beetle

Neotaranomis australis is a species of beetle in the family Cerambycidae. It was described by Chemsak & Linsley in 1982.
