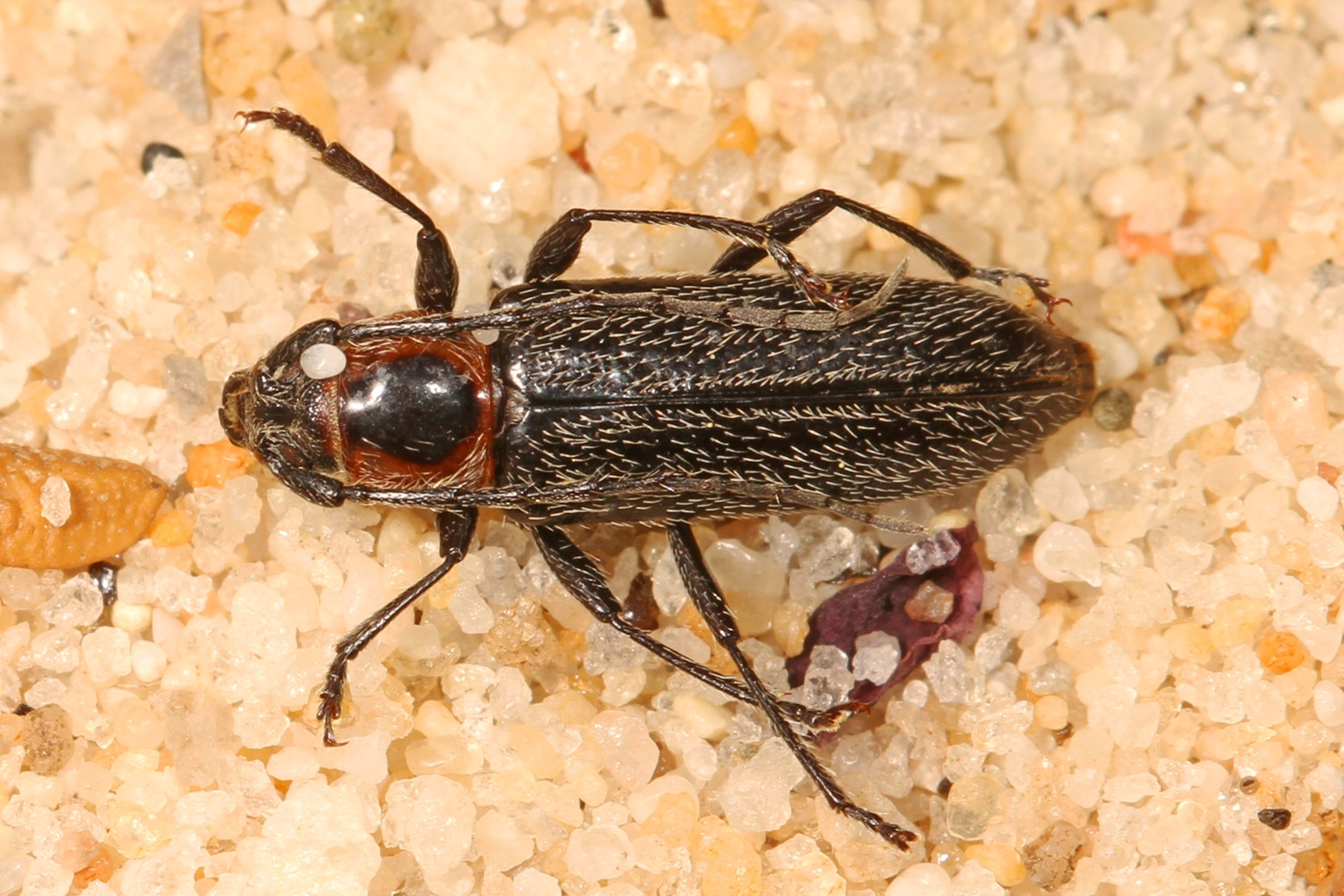
- Stenosphenus notatus

Scientific classification
- Domain: Eukaryota
- Kingdom: Animalia
- Phylum: Arthropoda
- Class: Insecta
- Order: Coleoptera
- Suborder: Polyphaga
- Infraorder: Cucujiformia
- Family: Cerambycidae
- Tribe: Elaphidiini
- Genus: Stenosphenus

= Stenosphenus =

Genus of beetles

Stenosphenus is a genus of beetles in the family Cerambycidae, containing the following species:

- Stenosphenus beyeri Schaeffer, 1905
- Stenosphenus bivittatus Giesbert & Chemsak, 1989
- Stenosphenus cordovanus Giesbert & Chemsak, 1989
- Stenosphenus cribripennis Thomson, 1860
- Stenosphenus debilis Horn, 1885
- Stenosphenus dolosus Horn, 1885
- Stenosphenus gaumeri Bates, 1892
- Stenosphenus insulicola Fisher, 1942
- Stenosphenus langurioides Bates, 1885
- Stenosphenus lineatus Bates, 1885
- Stenosphenus lugens LeConte, 1862
- Stenosphenus maccartyi Giesbert & Chemsak, 1989
- Stenosphenus notatus (Olivier, 1795)
- Stenosphenus ochraceus Bates, 1872
- Stenosphenus penicilliventris Giesbert & Chemsak, 1989
- Stenosphenus proruber Giesbert & Chemsak, 1989
- Stenosphenus protensus Bates, 1880
- Stenosphenus rubidus Linsley, 1935
- Stenosphenus rufipes Bates, 1872
- Stenosphenus sobrius (Newman, 1840)
- Stenosphenus suturalis Bates, 1872
- Stenosphenus trispinosus Bates, 1872
- Stenosphenus vitticollis Bates, 1892
