= Crossidius testaceus =

Scientific classification
- Kingdom: Animalia
- Phylum: Arthropoda
- Class: Insecta
- Order: Coleoptera
- Suborder: Polyphaga
- Infraorder: Cucujiformia
- Family: Cerambycidae
- Genus: Crossidius
- Species: C. testaceus

Binomial name
- Crossidius testaceus LeConte, 1851

Species of beetle

Crossidius testaceus is a species of long-horned beetle in the family Cerambycidae. It is found in Central America and North America.

== Subspecies ==
- Crossidius testaceus maculicollis Casey, 1912
- Crossidius testaceus testaceus LeConte, 1851
