= Stenosphenus debilis =

Scientific classification
- Domain: Eukaryota
- Kingdom: Animalia
- Phylum: Arthropoda
- Class: Insecta
- Order: Coleoptera
- Suborder: Polyphaga
- Infraorder: Cucujiformia
- Family: Cerambycidae
- Genus: Stenosphenus
- Species: S. debilis

Binomial name
- Stenosphenus debilis Horn, 1885

Species of beetle

Stenosphenus debilis is a species of beetle in the family Cerambycidae. It was described by Horn in 1885.
