= Stenosphenus lugens =

Scientific classification
- Domain: Eukaryota
- Kingdom: Animalia
- Phylum: Arthropoda
- Class: Insecta
- Order: Coleoptera
- Suborder: Polyphaga
- Infraorder: Cucujiformia
- Family: Cerambycidae
- Genus: Stenosphenus
- Species: S. lugens

Binomial name
- Stenosphenus lugens LeConte, 1862

Species of beetle

Stenosphenus lugens is a species of beetle in the family Cerambycidae. It was described by John Lawrence LeConte in 1862.
