= Crambus rickseckerellus =

Scientific classification
- Kingdom: Animalia
- Phylum: Arthropoda
- Clade: Pancrustacea
- Class: Insecta
- Order: Lepidoptera
- Family: Crambidae
- Genus: Crambus
- Species: C. rickseckerellus

Binomial name
- Crambus rickseckerellus Klots, 1940

Synonyms
- Crambus leachellus rickseckerellus Klots, 1940

Species of moth

Crambus rickseckerellus is a moth in the family Crambidae. It was described by Alexander Barrett Klots in 1940. It is found in the US state of California. It was named in honor of Lucius Edgar Ricksecker.

== See also ==
- Pleocoma rickseckeri
