= Anisotyma =

Scientific classification
- Kingdom: Animalia
- Phylum: Arthropoda
- Class: Insecta
- Order: Coleoptera
- Suborder: Polyphaga
- Infraorder: Cucujiformia
- Family: Cerambycidae
- Genus: Anisotyma
- Species: A. soteri

Binomial name
- Anisotyma soteri Napp & Monne, 2009

Species of beetle

Anisotyma is a genus of beetle in the family Cerambycidae, it contains a single species Anisotyma soteri. It was described by Napp and Monne in 2009.
