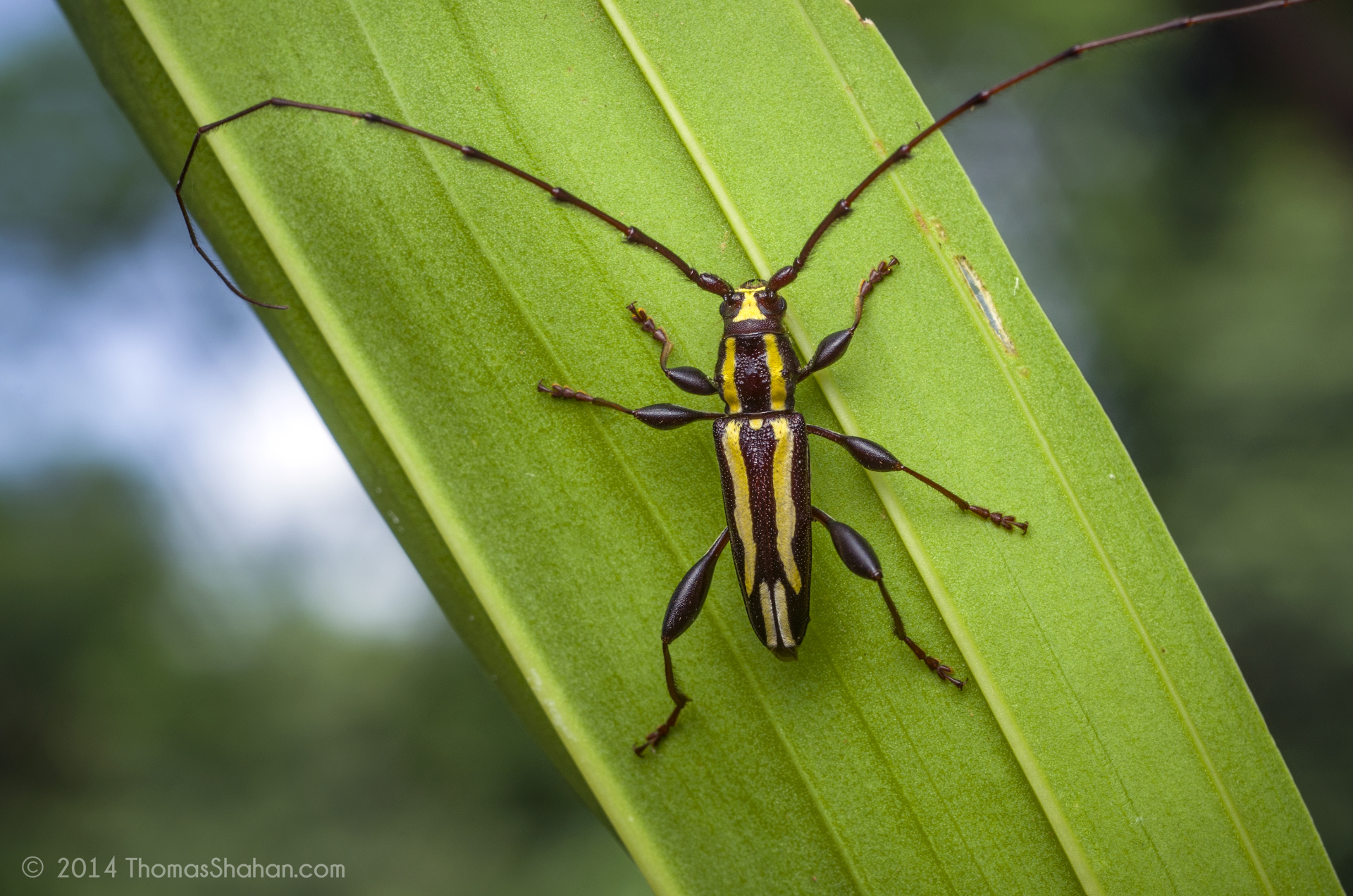

Scientific classification
- Kingdom: Animalia
- Phylum: Arthropoda
- Class: Insecta
- Order: Coleoptera
- Suborder: Polyphaga
- Infraorder: Cucujiformia
- Family: Cerambycidae
- Genus: Ornithia
- Species: O. mexicana

Binomial name
- Ornithia mexicana (Sturm, 1843)

= Ornithia =

Species of beetle

Ornithia mexicana is a species of beetle in the family Cerambycidae. It is the only species of the genus Ornithia . It was described by Sturm in 1843.
