= Earle Gorton Linsley =

American entomologist

Earle Gorton Linsley (May 1, 1910, in Oakland, California – March 8, 2000) was an American entomologist.

In study at the University of California, Berkeley Linsley gained a Bachelor of Science in 1932, a Master of Science in 1933, and a Doctorate in 1938.

Linsley was a world-renowned expert in on the beetle family Cerambycidae.

Linsley described many species including:

- Pleocoma bicolor
- Pleocoma blaisdelli
- Pleocoma carinata
- Pleocoma crinita
- Pleocoma dubitabilis
- Pleocoma hirticollis
- Pleocoma lucia
- Pleocoma minor
- Pleocoma nitida
- Pleocoma sonomae
- Pleocoma venturae
- Pleocoma trifoliata
- Tetropium pilosicorne

Pleocoma linsleyi was named in his honor.
