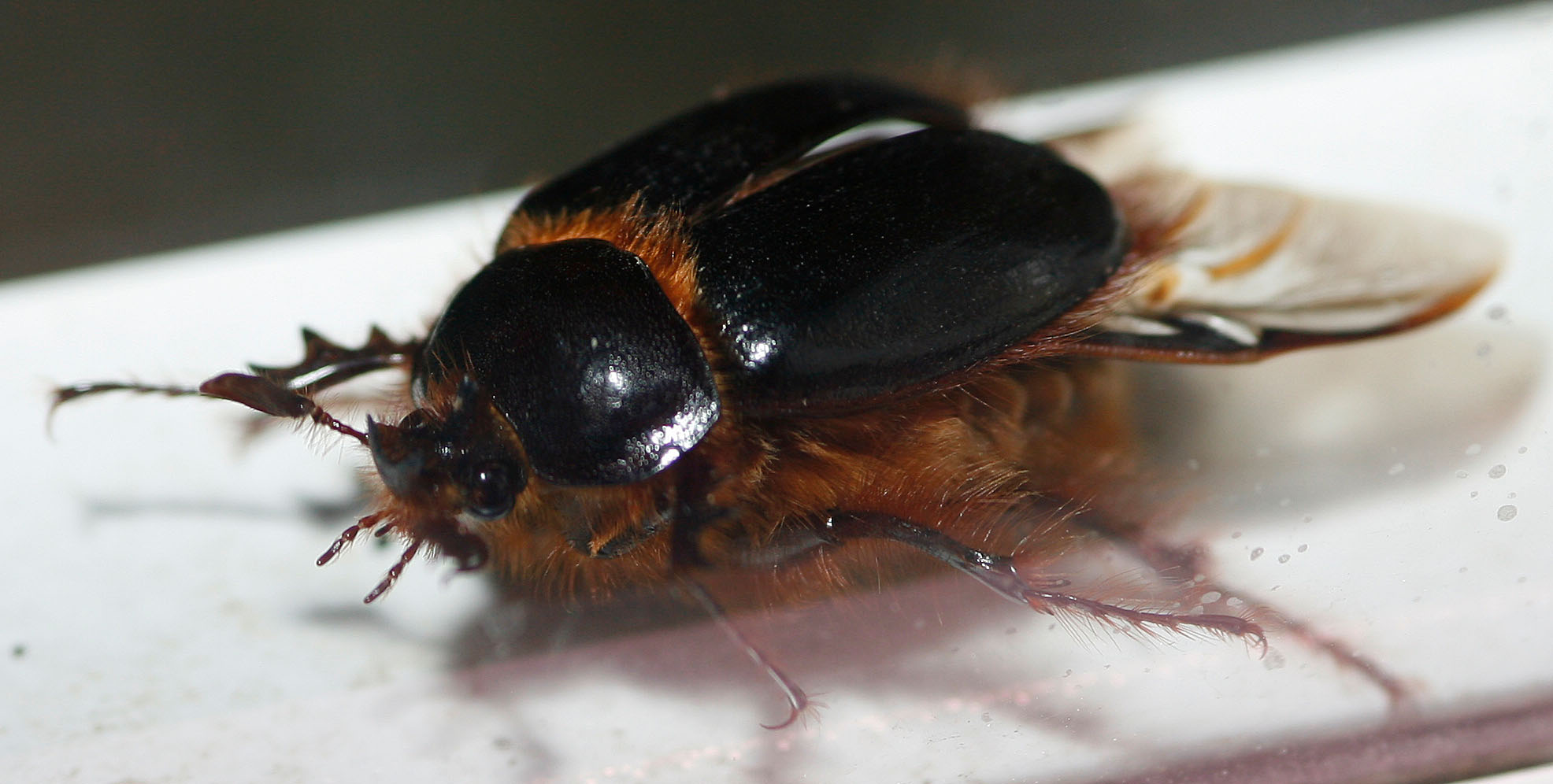
- Pleocoma

Scientific classification
- Kingdom: Animalia
- Phylum: Arthropoda
- Class: Insecta
- Order: Coleoptera
- Suborder: Polyphaga
- Infraorder: Scarabaeiformia
- Superfamily: Scarabaeoidea
- Family: Pleocomidae; LeConte, 1861

Genera
- Pleocoma LeConte, 1856; †Cretocoma Nikolaev, 2002; †Proteroscarabeus Grabau 1923

= Rain beetle =

Rain beetles Temporal range: Late Cretaceous–recent

Family of beetles

The rain beetles are a group of beetles whose extant species are found only in the far west of North America. They spend most of their lives underground, emerging in response to rain or snow, thus the common name. Formerly classified in the Scarabaeidae (and later the Geotrupidae), they are currently assigned to their own family Pleocomidae, considered the sister group to all the remaining families of Scarabaeoidea. The family contains a single extant genus, Pleocoma, and two extinct genera, Cretocoma, described in 2002 from Late Cretaceous deposits in Mongolia, and Proteroscarabeus of Late Cretaceous China.

== Biology ==
Adult rain beetles lack functioning mouthparts and are unable to feed. Instead, they rely on fat storage from when they were larvae. Larvae feed on the roots of shrubs and trees, as well as fungi and other organic matter. Larvae feeding on orchard trees can result in patches or winding bands on tree roots, and ultimately causes reduced foliage and fruit yield for trees.

Rain beetles spend most of their lives as larvae underground, burrowing up to twelve feet below the surface. Larvae can live between 7 and 14 years before they pupate into adulthood. They need at least seven instars, or developmental stages between molts, before they can pupate, but some may take more.

Male rain beetles exhibit most mating behavior during winter nights. As the females are flightless, the males spend a large portion of time walking on snow in search of them. This also limits the known modern distribution of the beetles. The male's ability to maintain a high internal temperature, up to 95 degrees, is critical to their mating and survival prospects, as their thoracic pile is ineffective insulation.

The lifespan of adult rain beetles is also dependent on their sex. The males live only a few days, expending most of their energy in search of mates, while the females can survive a few months in their burrow.

== Distribution ==
Most rain beetle populations are in mountainous California. They have not been found in the desert but also live in parts of the Sacramento Valley and coastal plain of the San Diego Valley. Extant members of Pleocoma are known from extreme southern Washington, throughout the mountains of Oregon and California, and into the extreme north of Baja California.
