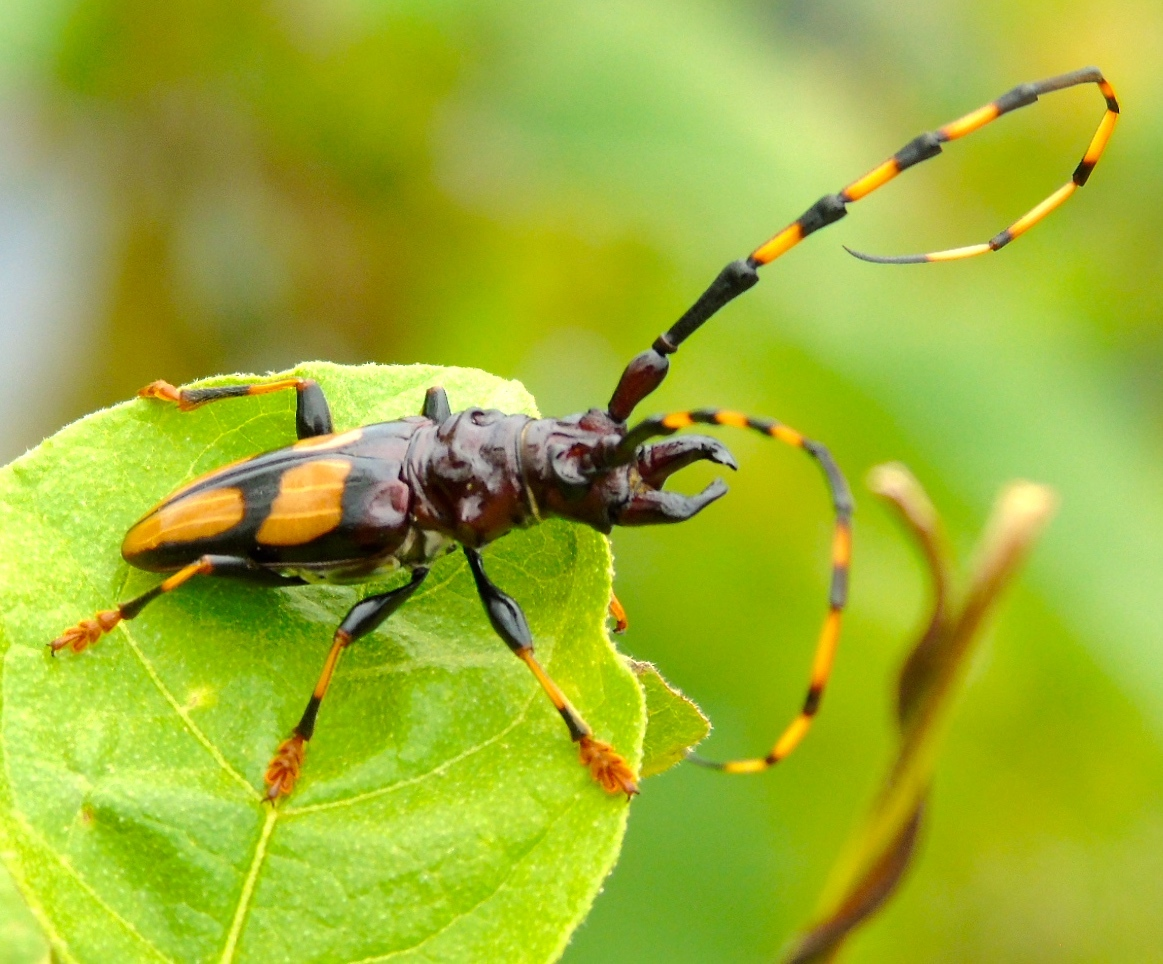
- Dendrobias mandibularis

Scientific classification
- Domain: Eukaryota
- Kingdom: Animalia
- Phylum: Arthropoda
- Class: Insecta
- Order: Coleoptera
- Suborder: Polyphaga
- Infraorder: Cucujiformia
- Family: Cerambycidae
- Subfamily: Cerambycinae
- Tribe: Trachyderini
- Genus: Dendrobias; Dupont, 1834

Synonyms
- Dendrobius LeConte, 1858 (misspelling)

= Dendrobias =

Genus of beetles

Dendrobias is a genus of beetles in the family Cerambycidae. Members of this genus were, for several years, included within Trachyderes, but removed from synonymy in 2018.

== Species ==
- Dendrobias mandibularis (Dupont, 1834)
- Dendrobias maxillosus (Dupont, 1834)
- Dendrobias steinhauseni Hüdepohl, 1987
