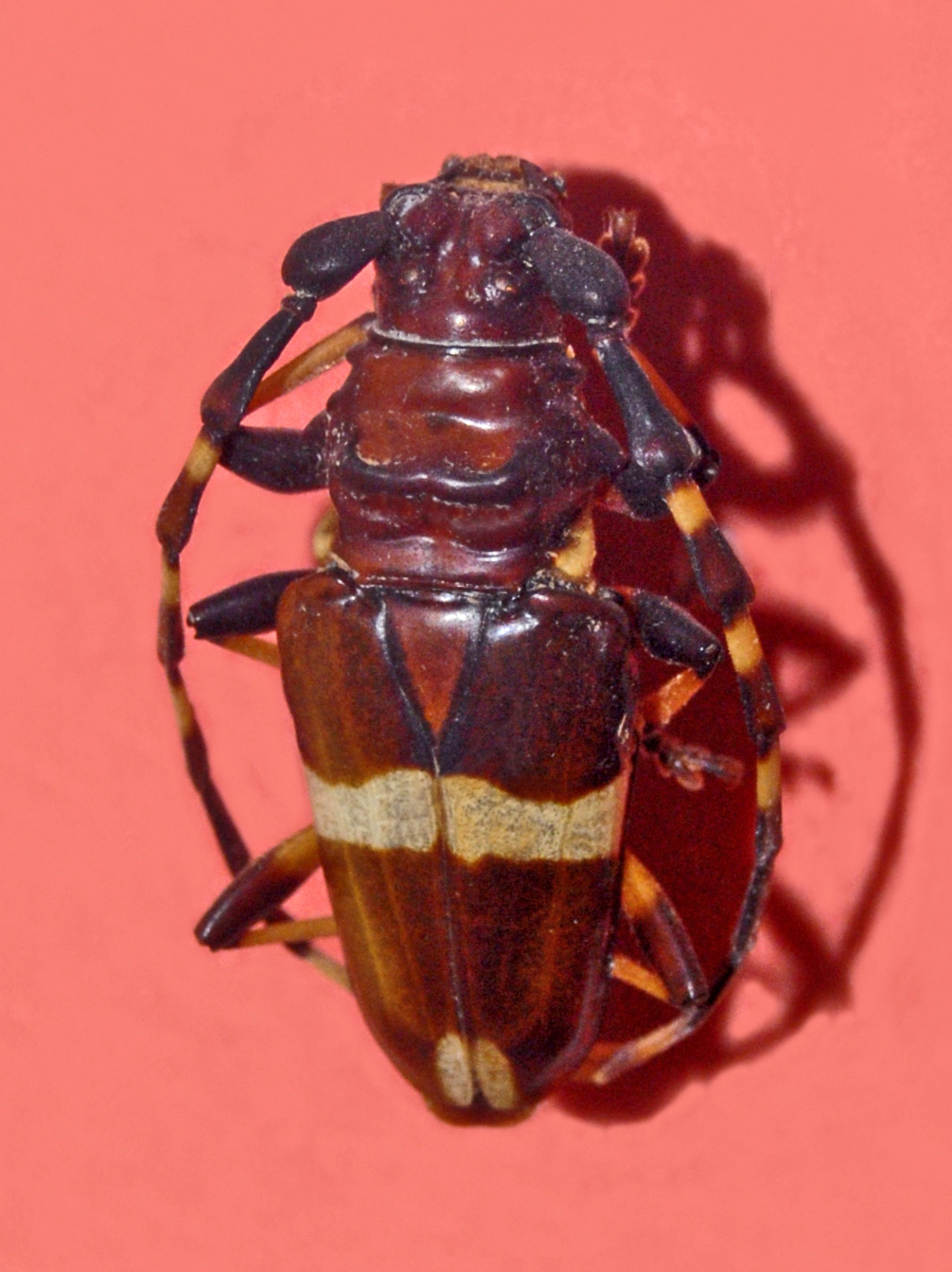
- Museum specimen of Trachyderes cingulatus

Scientific classification
- Domain: Eukaryota
- Kingdom: Animalia
- Phylum: Arthropoda
- Class: Insecta
- Order: Coleoptera
- Suborder: Polyphaga
- Infraorder: Cucujiformia
- Family: Cerambycidae
- Genus: Trachyderes
- Species: T. cingulatus

Binomial name
- Trachyderes cingulatus Klug, 1825

Synonyms
- Trachyderes reichei peruvianus Tippmann, 1953; Trachyderes reichii Dupont, 1836

= Trachyderes cingulatus =

Species of beetle

Trachyderes cingualtus is a species of beetles in the family Cerambycidae. This species can reach a length of 25–35 millimetres (0.98–1.38 in). It is present in Brazil, Peru and Bolivia.
