= Trachyderes elegans =

Scientific classification
- Domain: Eukaryota
- Kingdom: Animalia
- Phylum: Arthropoda
- Class: Insecta
- Order: Coleoptera
- Suborder: Polyphaga
- Infraorder: Cucujiformia
- Family: Cerambycidae
- Genus: Trachyderes
- Species: T. elegans

Binomial name
- Trachyderes elegans Dupont, 1836

Species of beetle

Trachyderes elegans is a species of beetle in the family Cerambycidae. It was described by Dupont in 1836.
