= Dendrobias steinhauseni =

Scientific classification
- Domain: Eukaryota
- Kingdom: Animalia
- Phylum: Arthropoda
- Class: Insecta
- Order: Coleoptera
- Suborder: Polyphaga
- Infraorder: Cucujiformia
- Family: Cerambycidae
- Subfamily: Cerambycinae
- Tribe: Trachyderini
- Genus: Dendrobias
- Species: D. steinhauseni

Binomial name
- Dendrobias steinhauseni (Hüdepohl, 1987)

Synonyms
- Trachyderes steinhauseni Hüdepohl, 1987

Species of beetle

Dendrobias steinhauseni is a species of beetle in the family Cerambycidae. It was described by Hüdepohl in 1987.
