= Trachyderes pacificus =

Scientific classification
- Domain: Eukaryota
- Kingdom: Animalia
- Phylum: Arthropoda
- Class: Insecta
- Order: Coleoptera
- Suborder: Polyphaga
- Infraorder: Cucujiformia
- Family: Cerambycidae
- Genus: Trachyderes
- Species: T. pacificus

Binomial name
- Trachyderes pacificus Huedepohl, 1985

Species of beetle

Trachyderes pacificus is a species of beetle in the family Cerambycidae. It was described by Huedepohl in 1985.
