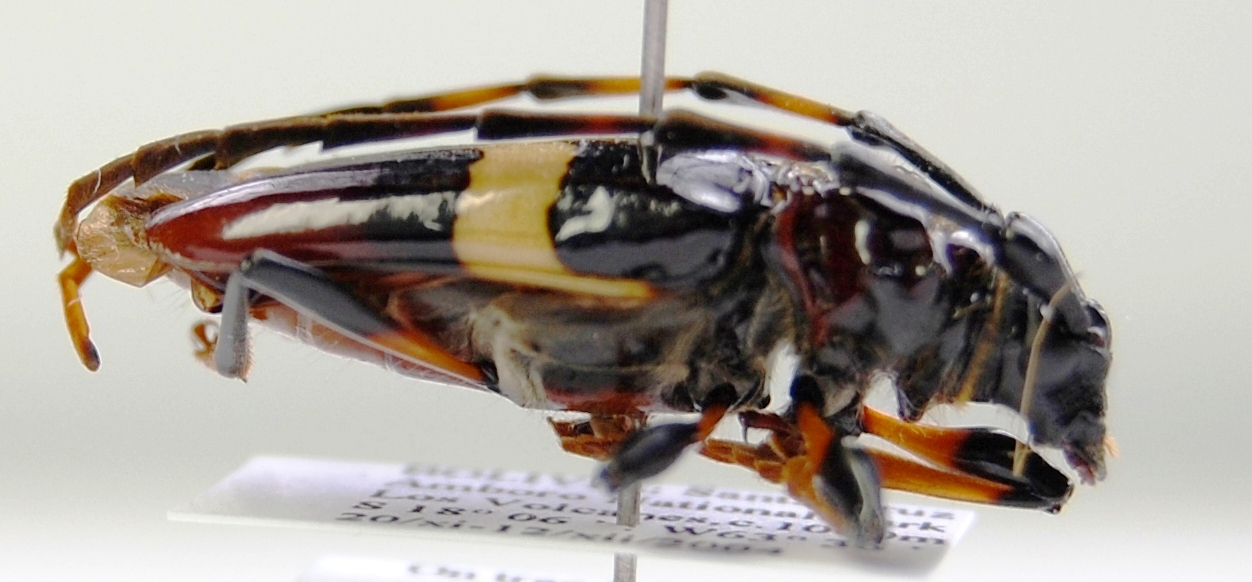
- A preserved specimen of a subspecies of Trachyderus leptomerus (T. leptomerus boliviensis)

Scientific classification
- Domain: Eukaryota
- Kingdom: Animalia
- Phylum: Arthropoda
- Class: Insecta
- Order: Coleoptera
- Suborder: Polyphaga
- Infraorder: Cucujiformia
- Family: Cerambycidae
- Genus: Trachyderes
- Species: T. leptomerus

Binomial name
- Trachyderes leptomerus Aurivillius, 1908

= Trachyderes leptomerus =

Species of beetle

Trachyderes leptomerus is a species of beetle in the family Cerambycidae. It was described by Per Olof Christopher Aurivillius in 1908.
