= Trachyderes armatus =

Scientific classification
- Domain: Eukaryota
- Kingdom: Animalia
- Phylum: Arthropoda
- Class: Insecta
- Order: Coleoptera
- Suborder: Polyphaga
- Infraorder: Cucujiformia
- Family: Cerambycidae
- Genus: Trachyderes
- Species: T. armatus

Binomial name
- Trachyderes armatus Monne & Martins, 1973

Species of beetle

Trachyderes armatus is a species of beetle in the family Cerambycidae. It was described by Monne & Martins in 1973.
