= Dendrobias maxillosus =

Scientific classification
- Domain: Eukaryota
- Kingdom: Animalia
- Phylum: Arthropoda
- Class: Insecta
- Order: Coleoptera
- Suborder: Polyphaga
- Infraorder: Cucujiformia
- Family: Cerambycidae
- Subfamily: Cerambycinae
- Tribe: Trachyderini
- Genus: Dendrobias
- Species: D. maxillosus

Binomial name
- Dendrobias maxillosus (Dupont, 1834)

Synonyms
- Trachyderes maxillosus Dupont, 1834

Species of beetle

Dendrobias maxillosus is a species of beetle in the family Cerambycidae. It was described by Dupont in 1834.
