= Trachyderes distinctus =

Scientific classification
- Domain: Eukaryota
- Kingdom: Animalia
- Phylum: Arthropoda
- Class: Insecta
- Order: Coleoptera
- Suborder: Polyphaga
- Infraorder: Cucujiformia
- Family: Cerambycidae
- Genus: Trachyderes
- Species: T. distinctus

Binomial name
- Trachyderes distinctus Bosq, 1951

Species of beetle

Trachyderes distinctus is a species of beetle in the family Cerambycidae. It was described by Bosq in 1951.
