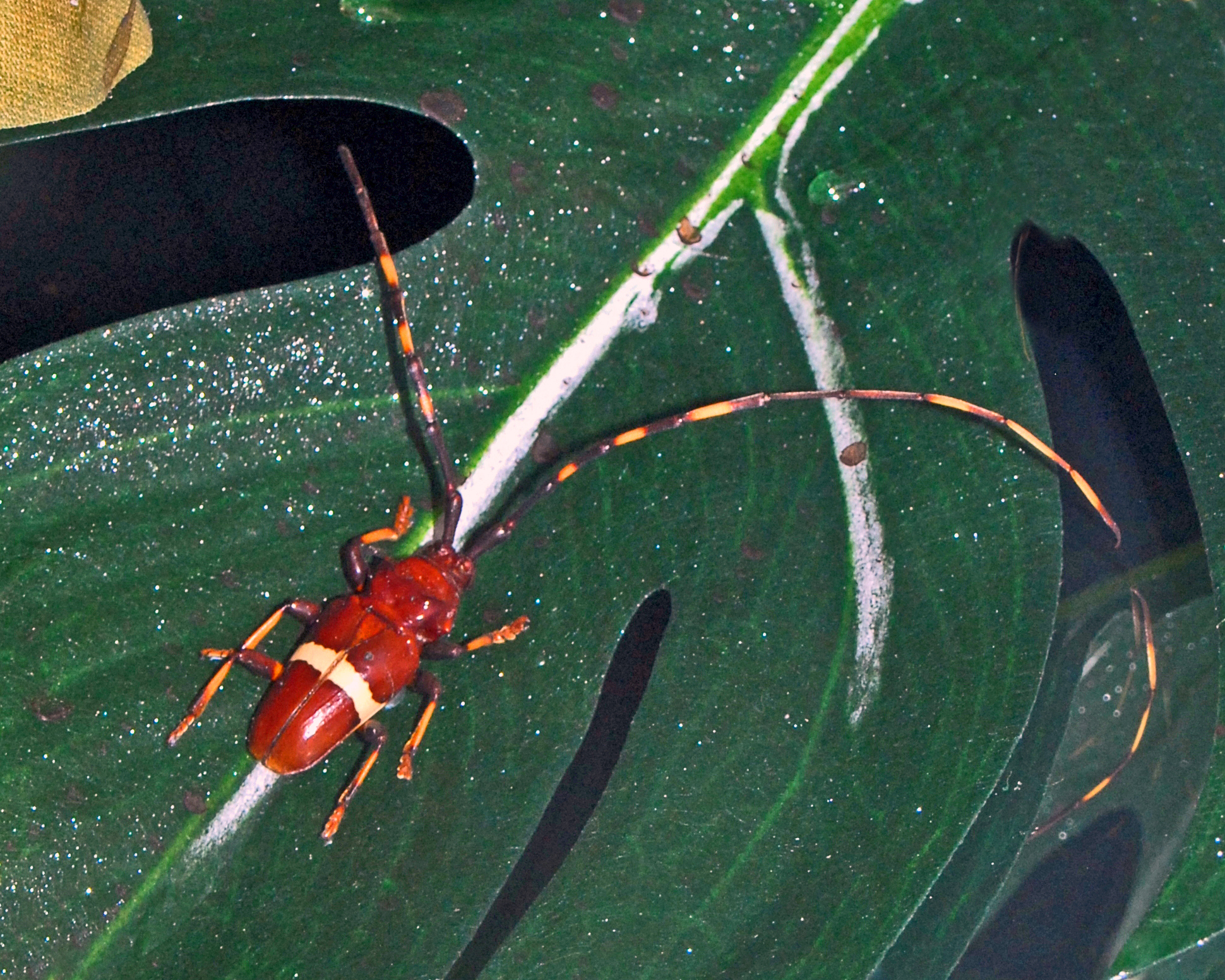

Scientific classification
- Kingdom: Animalia
- Phylum: Arthropoda
- Clade: Pancrustacea
- Class: Insecta
- Order: Coleoptera
- Suborder: Polyphaga
- Infraorder: Cucujiformia
- Family: Cerambycidae
- Genus: Trachyderes
- Species: T. succinctus

Binomial name
- Trachyderes succinctus (Linnaeus, 1758)

Synonyms
- Cerambyx succinctus Linné, 1758; Trachyderes nigricornis Aurivillius, 1909; Trachyderes cayennensis Dupont, 1836; Trachyderes intermedia Dupont, 1836; Trachyderes interrupta Dupont, 1836; Trachyderes rubripes Dupont, 1836; Trachyderes subfasciata Dupont, 1836; Trachyderes transversalis Dupont, 1836; Cerambyx zonarius Houttuyn, 1766

= Trachyderes succinctus =

Species of beetle

Trachyderes succinctus is a species of beetle in the family Cerambycidae. It was described by Carl Linnaeus in his landmark 1758 10th edition of Systema Naturae.

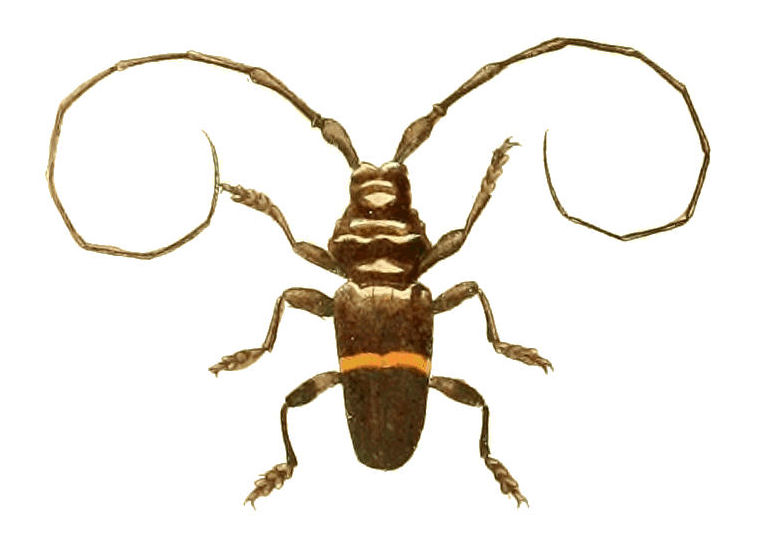
Illustration of Trachyderes succinctus

== Description ==
Trachyderes succinctus can reach a length of about 1 inch (25 mm). Head is reddish or dark brown, or dirty black, and very rough. Antennae are longer than the insect, with the two basal joints blueish black; the rest is red brown, the extremity of each joint being blueish black.

Thorax is reddish or dark brown, shining, and very rough, with large swelling in the middle; having two short thick tubercles on each side. Scutellum is large and long.

Elytra are reddish or dark brown, margined and shining, rather broad at their extremities, and spineless; having a narrow transverse yellow bar in the middle. Abdomen is dark brown. Femora are dark brown at the base, black at the tips. Tibiae and tarsi are reddish or red brown; the latter cushioned beneath with yellow pile.

== Distribution ==
This species is present in Argentina, Uruguay, Bolivia, Brazil, Costa Rica, Panama, Colombia, Ecuador, Nicaragua, Paraguay, Peru, Venezuela, Suriname, French Guiana, Bolivia and the Antilles.

== Subspecies ==
- Trachyderes succincta succincta
- Trachyderes succincta duponti Aurivillius, 1912
- Trachyderes succincta flaviventris Aurivillius, 1909
- Trachyderes succincta melzeri Schwarzer, 1929
