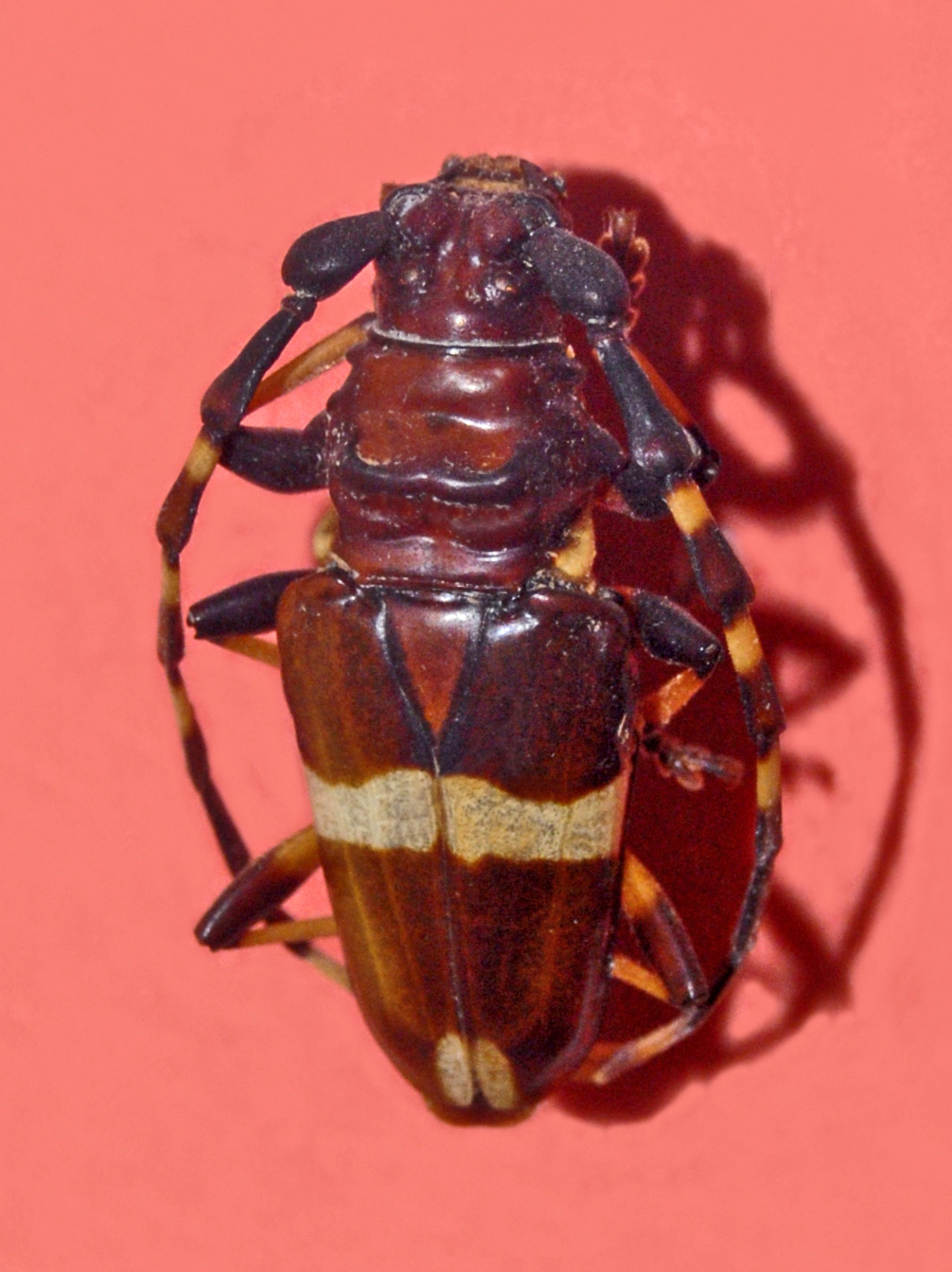
- Museum specimen of Trachyderes cingulatus

Scientific classification
- Domain: Eukaryota
- Kingdom: Animalia
- Phylum: Arthropoda
- Class: Insecta
- Order: Coleoptera
- Suborder: Polyphaga
- Infraorder: Cucujiformia
- Family: Cerambycidae
- Subfamily: Cerambycinae
- Tribe: Trachyderini
- Genus: Trachyderes; Dalman, 1817

= Trachyderes =

Genus of beetles

Trachyderes is a genus of beetles in the family Cerambycidae, containing the following species:

- Trachyderes armatus Monne & Martins, 1973
- Trachyderes badius Dupont, 1840
- Trachyderes cauaburi Huedepohl, 1985
- Trachyderes cingulatus Klug, 1825
- Trachyderes distinctus Bosq, 1951
- Trachyderes elegans Dupont, 1836
- Trachyderes hermani Huedepohl, 1985
- Trachyderes hilaris Bates, 1880
- Trachyderes latecinctus Martins, 1975
- Trachyderes leptomerus Aurivillius, 1908
- Trachyderes melas Bates, 1870
- Trachyderes pacificus Huedepohl, 1985
- Trachyderes politus Bates, 1870
- Trachyderes succinctus (Linnaeus, 1758)
