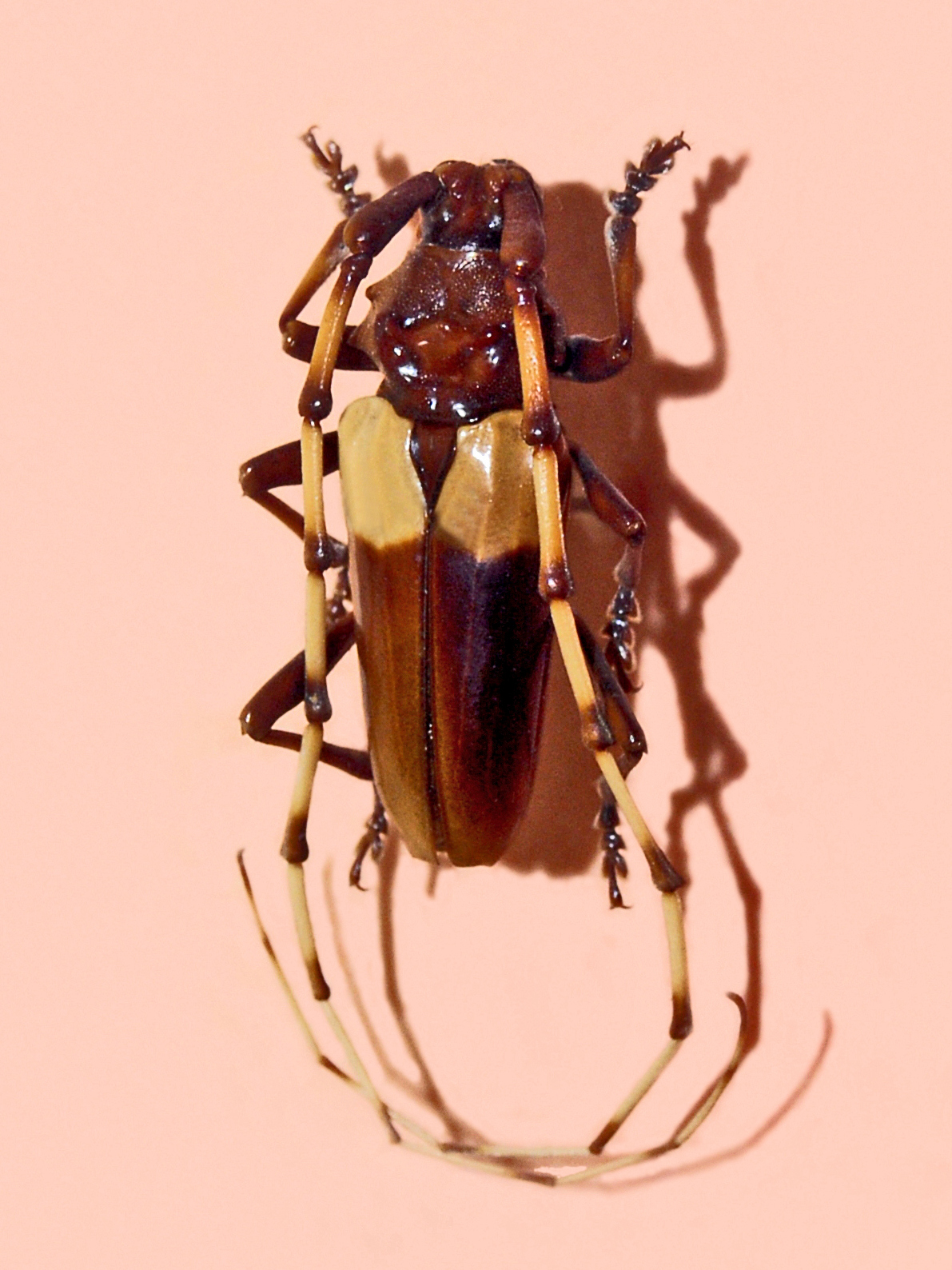
- Museum specimen of Andraegoidus cruentatus

Scientific classification
- Domain: Eukaryota
- Kingdom: Animalia
- Phylum: Arthropoda
- Class: Insecta
- Order: Coleoptera
- Suborder: Polyphaga
- Infraorder: Cucujiformia
- Family: Cerambycidae
- Subfamily: Cerambycinae
- Tribe: Trachyderini
- Genus: Andraegoidus; Aurivillius, 1920

= Andraegoidus =

Genus of beetles

Andraegoidus is a genus of beetles in the family Cerambycidae, containing the following species:

- Andraegoidus cruentatus (Dupont, 1838)
- Andraegoidus distinguendus Huedepohl, 1985
- Andraegoidus fabricii (Dupont, 1838)
- Andraegoidus homoplatus (Dupont, 1838)
- Andraegoidus lacordairei (Dupont, 1838)
- Andraegoidus laticollis Tippmann, 1953
- Andraegoidus richteri (Bruch, 1908)
- Andraegoidus rufipes (Fabricius, 1787)
- Andraegoidus translucidus Botero & Monne, 2011
- Andraegoidus variegatus (Perty, 1832)
