= Andraegoidus distinguendus =

Scientific classification
- Domain: Eukaryota
- Kingdom: Animalia
- Phylum: Arthropoda
- Class: Insecta
- Order: Coleoptera
- Suborder: Polyphaga
- Infraorder: Cucujiformia
- Family: Cerambycidae
- Genus: Andraegoidus
- Species: A. distinguendus

Binomial name
- Andraegoidus distinguendus (Huedepohl, 1985)

Species of beetle

Andraegoidus distinguendus is a species of beetle in the family Cerambycidae. It was described by Huedepohl in 1985.
