= Andraegoidus translucidus =

Scientific classification
- Domain: Eukaryota
- Kingdom: Animalia
- Phylum: Arthropoda
- Class: Insecta
- Order: Coleoptera
- Suborder: Polyphaga
- Infraorder: Cucujiformia
- Family: Cerambycidae
- Genus: Andraegoidus
- Species: A. translucidus

Binomial name
- Andraegoidus translucidus Botero & Monne, 2011

Species of beetle

Andraegoidus translucidus is a species of beetle in the family Cerambycidae. It was described by Botero & Monne in 2011.
