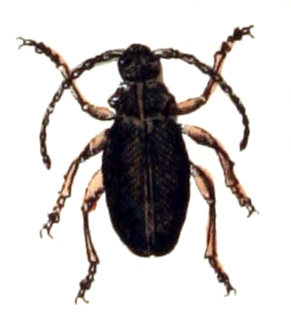

Scientific classification
- Kingdom: Animalia
- Phylum: Arthropoda
- Class: Insecta
- Order: Coleoptera
- Suborder: Polyphaga
- Infraorder: Cucujiformia
- Family: Cerambycidae
- Genus: Andraegoidus
- Species: A. rufipes

Binomial name
- Andraegoidus rufipes (Fabricius, 1787)

= Andraegoidus rufipes =

Species of beetle

Andraegoidus rufipes is a species of beetle in the family Cerambycidae. It was described by Johan Christian Fabricius in 1787.
