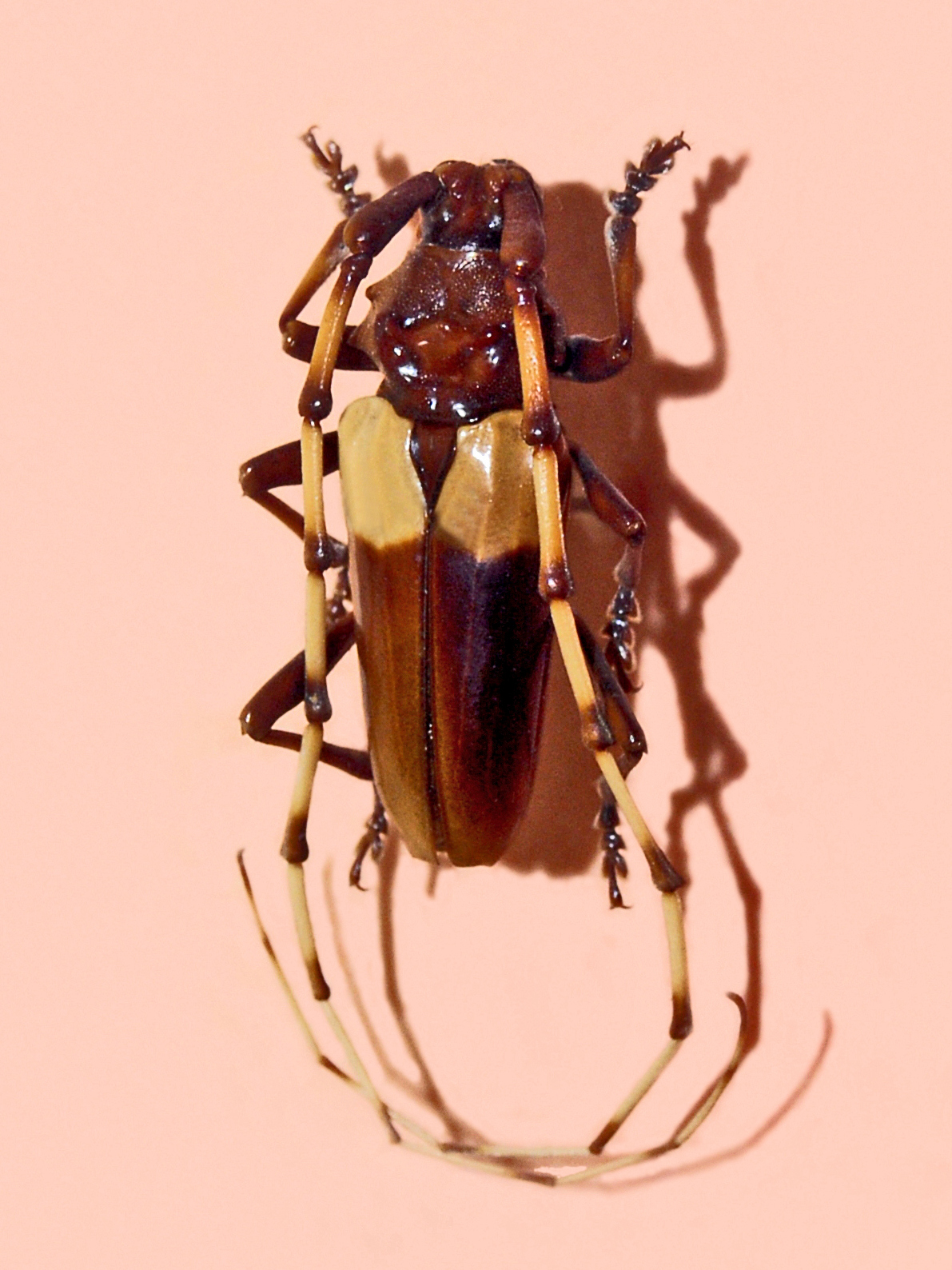
- Museum specimen of Andraegoidus cruentatus

Scientific classification
- Domain: Eukaryota
- Kingdom: Animalia
- Phylum: Arthropoda
- Class: Insecta
- Order: Coleoptera
- Suborder: Polyphaga
- Infraorder: Cucujiformia
- Family: Cerambycidae
- Genus: Andraegoidus
- Species: A. cruentatus

Binomial name
- Andraegoidus cruentatus (Dupont, 1838)

Synonyms
- Andraegoidus humeralis (Blackwelder) Aurivillius, 1920; Trachyderes cardinalis Dupont, 1838; Trachyderes cruentatus Dupont, 1838; Trachyderes humeralis Blackwelder, 1946

= Andraegoidus cruentatus =

Species of beetle

Andraegoidus cruentatus is a species of beetle in the family Cerambycidae. It was described by Dupont in 1838.

== Distribution ==
This species can be found in Paraguay, Argentina, Brazil and Uruguay.
