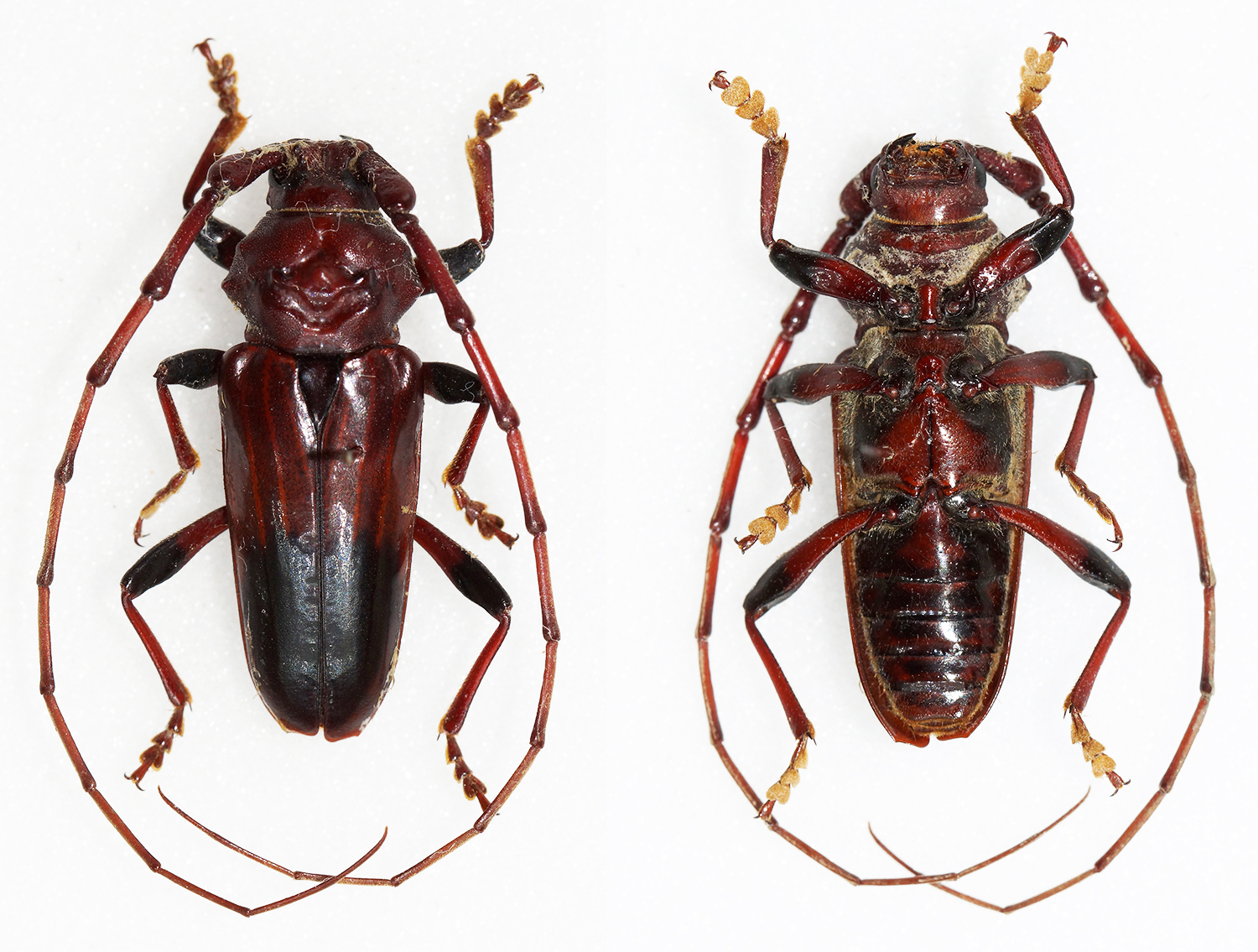
- Andraegoidus rufipes fabricii

Scientific classification
- Domain: Eukaryota
- Kingdom: Animalia
- Phylum: Arthropoda
- Class: Insecta
- Order: Coleoptera
- Suborder: Polyphaga
- Infraorder: Cucujiformia
- Family: Cerambycidae
- Genus: Andraegoidus
- Species: A. fabricii

Binomial name
- Andraegoidus fabricii (Dupont, 1838)

= Andraegoidus fabricii =

Species of beetle

Andraegoidus fabricii is a species of beetle in the family Cerambycidae. It was described by Henry Dupont in 1838.
