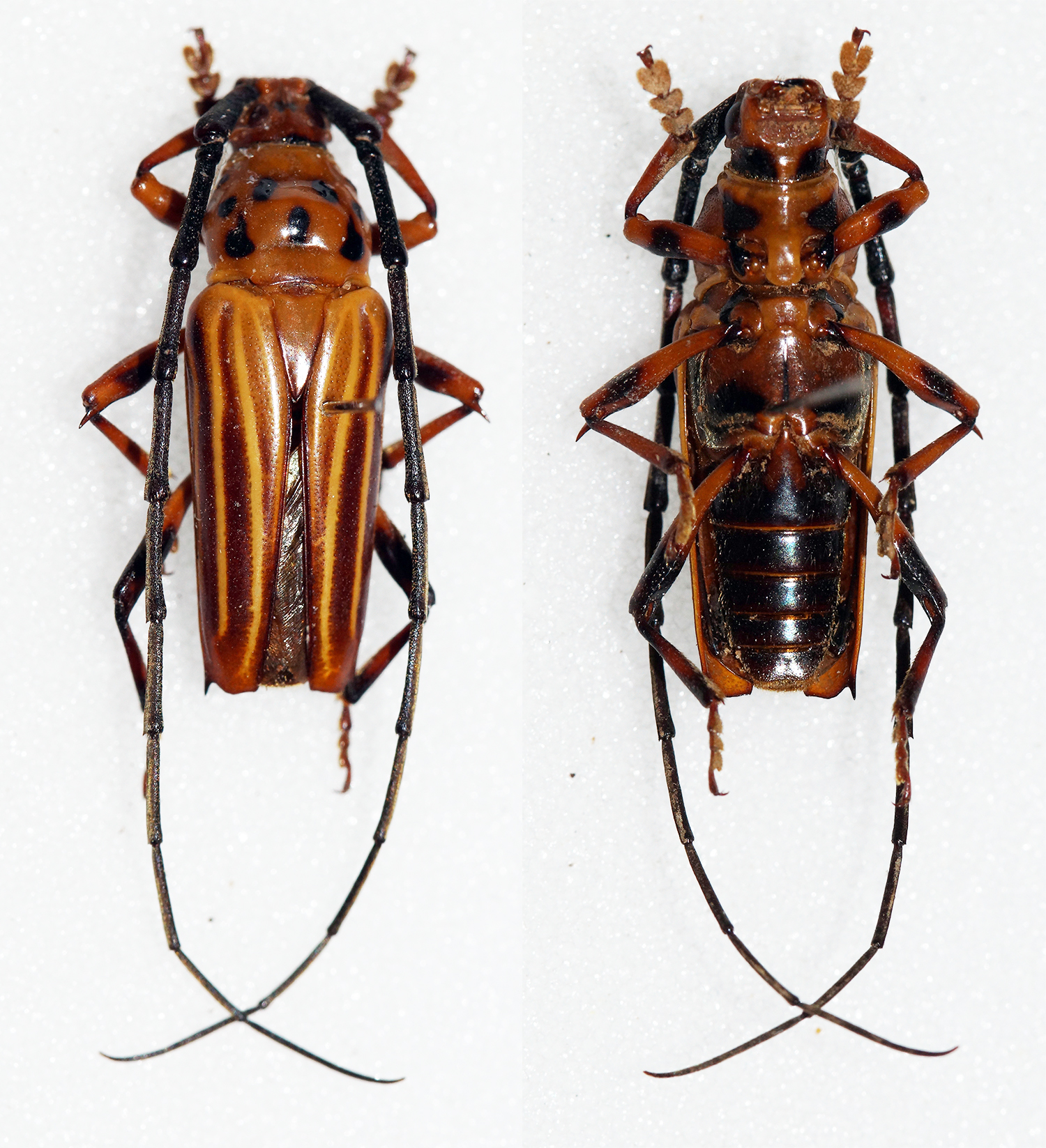

Scientific classification
- Domain: Eukaryota
- Kingdom: Animalia
- Phylum: Arthropoda
- Class: Insecta
- Order: Coleoptera
- Suborder: Polyphaga
- Infraorder: Cucujiformia
- Family: Cerambycidae
- Genus: Oxymerus
- Species: O. aculeatus

Binomial name
- Oxymerus aculeatus Dupont, 1838

= Oxymerus aculeatus =

Species of beetle

Oxymerus aculeatus is a species of beetle in the family Cerambycidae. It was described by Dupont in 1838.
