= Oxymerus vianai =

Scientific classification
- Domain: Eukaryota
- Kingdom: Animalia
- Phylum: Arthropoda
- Class: Insecta
- Order: Coleoptera
- Suborder: Polyphaga
- Infraorder: Cucujiformia
- Family: Cerambycidae
- Genus: Oxymerus
- Species: O. vianai

Binomial name
- Oxymerus vianai Huedepohl, 1979

Species of beetle

Oxymerus vianai is a species of beetle in the family Cerambycidae. It was described by Huedepohl in 1979.
