= Oxymerus bruchi =

Scientific classification
- Domain: Eukaryota
- Kingdom: Animalia
- Phylum: Arthropoda
- Class: Insecta
- Order: Coleoptera
- Suborder: Polyphaga
- Infraorder: Cucujiformia
- Family: Cerambycidae
- Genus: Oxymerus
- Species: O. bruchi

Binomial name
- Oxymerus bruchi Gounelle, 1913

Species of beetle

Oxymerus bruchi is a species of beetle in the family Cerambycidae. It was described by Gounelle in 1913.
