= Oxymerus flavescens =

Scientific classification
- Domain: Eukaryota
- Kingdom: Animalia
- Phylum: Arthropoda
- Class: Insecta
- Order: Coleoptera
- Suborder: Polyphaga
- Infraorder: Cucujiformia
- Family: Cerambycidae
- Genus: Oxymerus
- Species: O. flavescens

Binomial name
- Oxymerus flavescens (Thunberg, 1822)

Synonyms
- Cerambyx luteus Voet, 1781 (Unav.); Cerambyx quadrioculatus Schaller, 1783 (Unav.); Cerambyx porcatus Weber, 1801 (Unav.); Trachyderes flavescens Thunberg, 1822; Cerambyx (Trachyderes) rivulosus Germar, 1823

Species of beetle

Oxymerus flavescens is a species of beetle in the family Cerambycidae.
