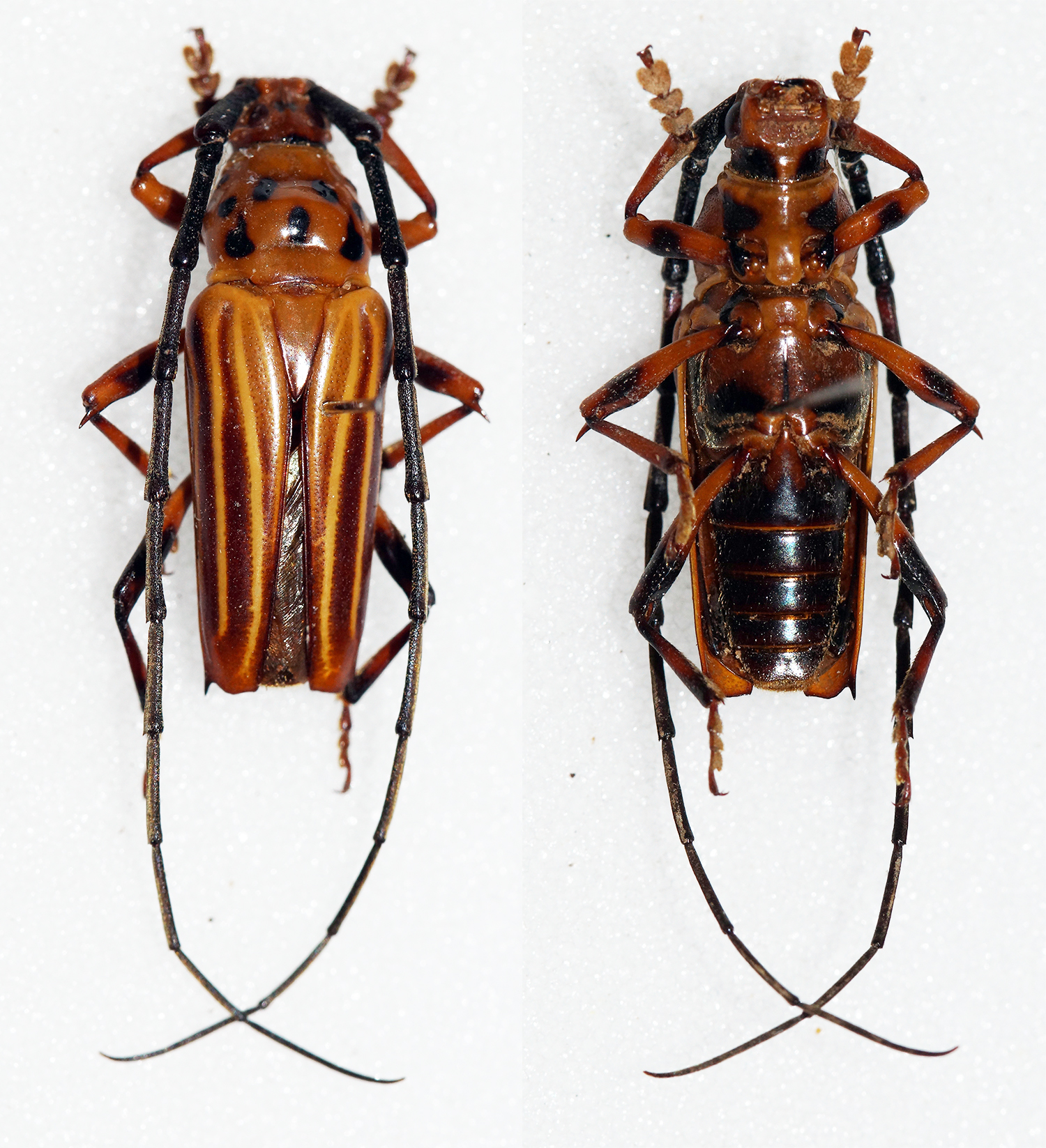
- Oxymerus aculeatus

Scientific classification
- Domain: Eukaryota
- Kingdom: Animalia
- Phylum: Arthropoda
- Class: Insecta
- Order: Coleoptera
- Suborder: Polyphaga
- Infraorder: Cucujiformia
- Family: Cerambycidae
- Subfamily: Cerambycinae
- Tribe: Trachyderini
- Genus: Oxymerus; Dupont in Audinet-Serville, 1834

= Oxymerus =

Genus of beetles

Oxymerus is a genus of beetles in the family Cerambycidae, containing the following species:

- Oxymerus aculeatus Dupont, 1838
- Oxymerus basalis (Dalman, 1823)
- Oxymerus bruchi Gounelle, 1913
- Oxymerus chevrolatii Dupont, 1838
- Oxymerus flavescens (Thunberg, 1822)
- Oxymerus lineatus Dupont, 1838
- Oxymerus pallidus Dupont, 1838
- Oxymerus punctatus Gounelle, 1911
- Oxymerus vianai Huedepohl, 1979
- Oxymerus virgatus Gounelle, 1913
