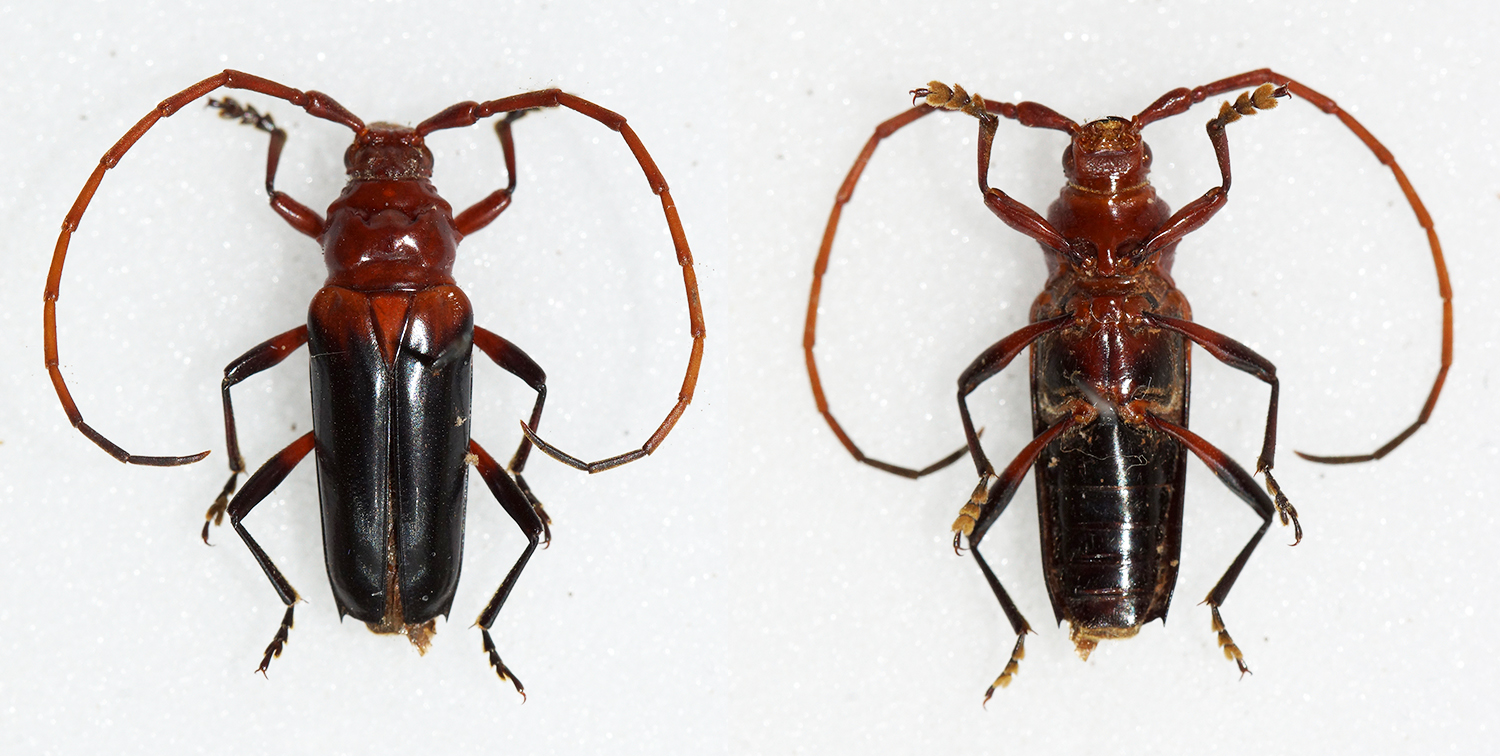

Scientific classification
- Domain: Eukaryota
- Kingdom: Animalia
- Phylum: Arthropoda
- Class: Insecta
- Order: Coleoptera
- Suborder: Polyphaga
- Infraorder: Cucujiformia
- Family: Cerambycidae
- Genus: Oxymerus
- Species: O. basalis

Binomial name
- Oxymerus basalis (Dalman, 1823)

= Oxymerus basalis =

Species of beetle

Oxymerus basalis is a species of beetle in the family Cerambycidae. It was described by Dalman in 1823.
