= Oxymerus punctatus =

Scientific classification
- Domain: Eukaryota
- Kingdom: Animalia
- Phylum: Arthropoda
- Class: Insecta
- Order: Coleoptera
- Suborder: Polyphaga
- Infraorder: Cucujiformia
- Family: Cerambycidae
- Genus: Oxymerus
- Species: O. punctatus

Binomial name
- Oxymerus punctatus Gounelle, 1911

Species of beetle

Oxymerus punctatus is a species of beetle in the family Cerambycidae. It was described by Gounelle in 1911.
