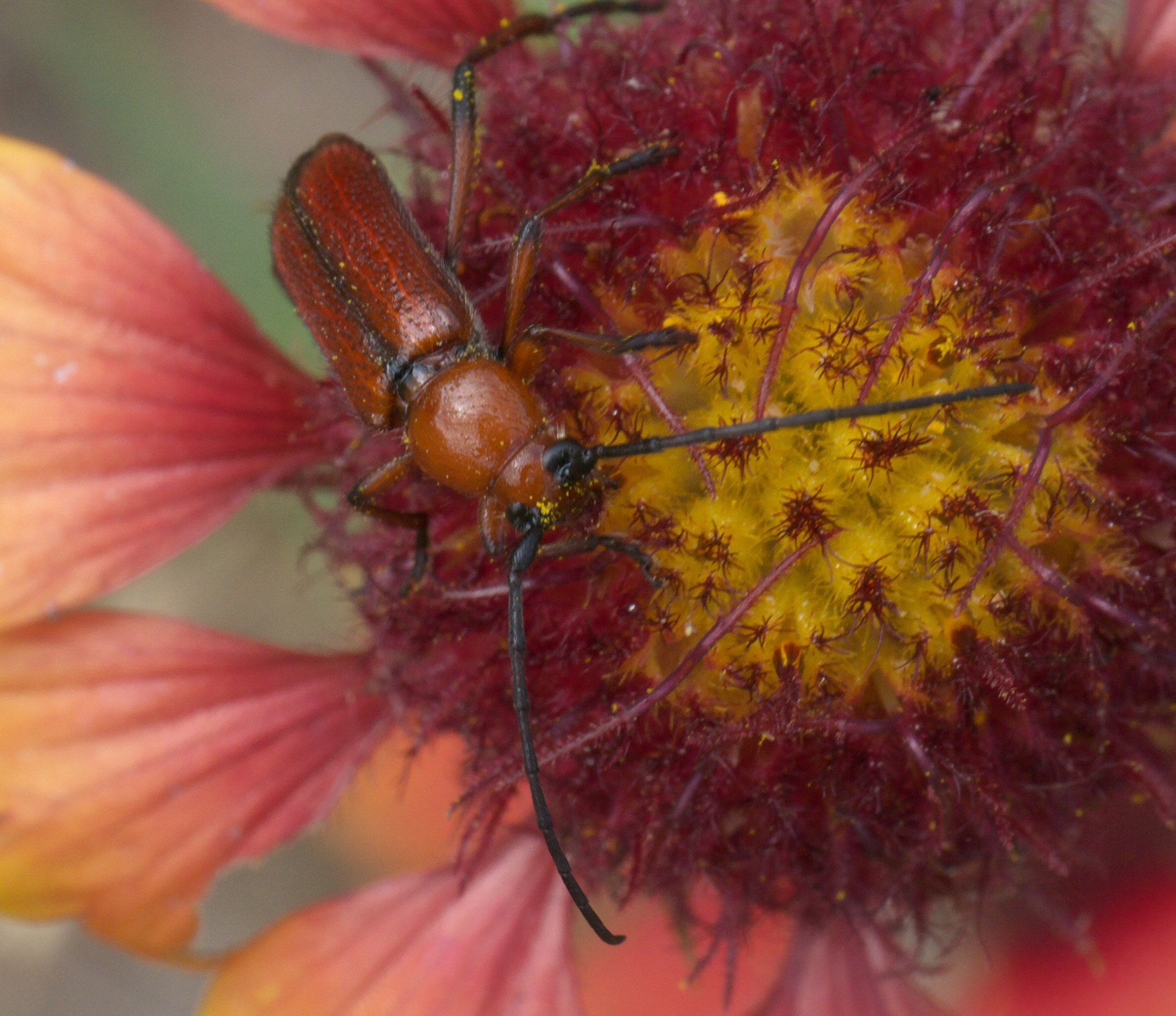

Scientific classification
- Domain: Eukaryota
- Kingdom: Animalia
- Phylum: Arthropoda
- Class: Insecta
- Order: Coleoptera
- Suborder: Polyphaga
- Infraorder: Cucujiformia
- Family: Cerambycidae
- Genus: Batyle
- Species: B. suturalis

Binomial name
- Batyle suturalis (Say, 1824)

= Batyle suturalis =

Species of beetle

Batyle suturalis is a species of beetle in the family Cerambycidae. It was described by Thomas Say in 1824.
