= Batyle knowltoni =

Scientific classification
- Domain: Eukaryota
- Kingdom: Animalia
- Phylum: Arthropoda
- Class: Insecta
- Order: Coleoptera
- Suborder: Polyphaga
- Infraorder: Cucujiformia
- Family: Cerambycidae
- Genus: Batyle
- Species: B. knowltoni

Binomial name
- Batyle knowltoni Knull, 1968

Species of beetle

Batyle knowltoni is a species of beetle in the family Cerambycidae. It was described by Knull in 1968.
