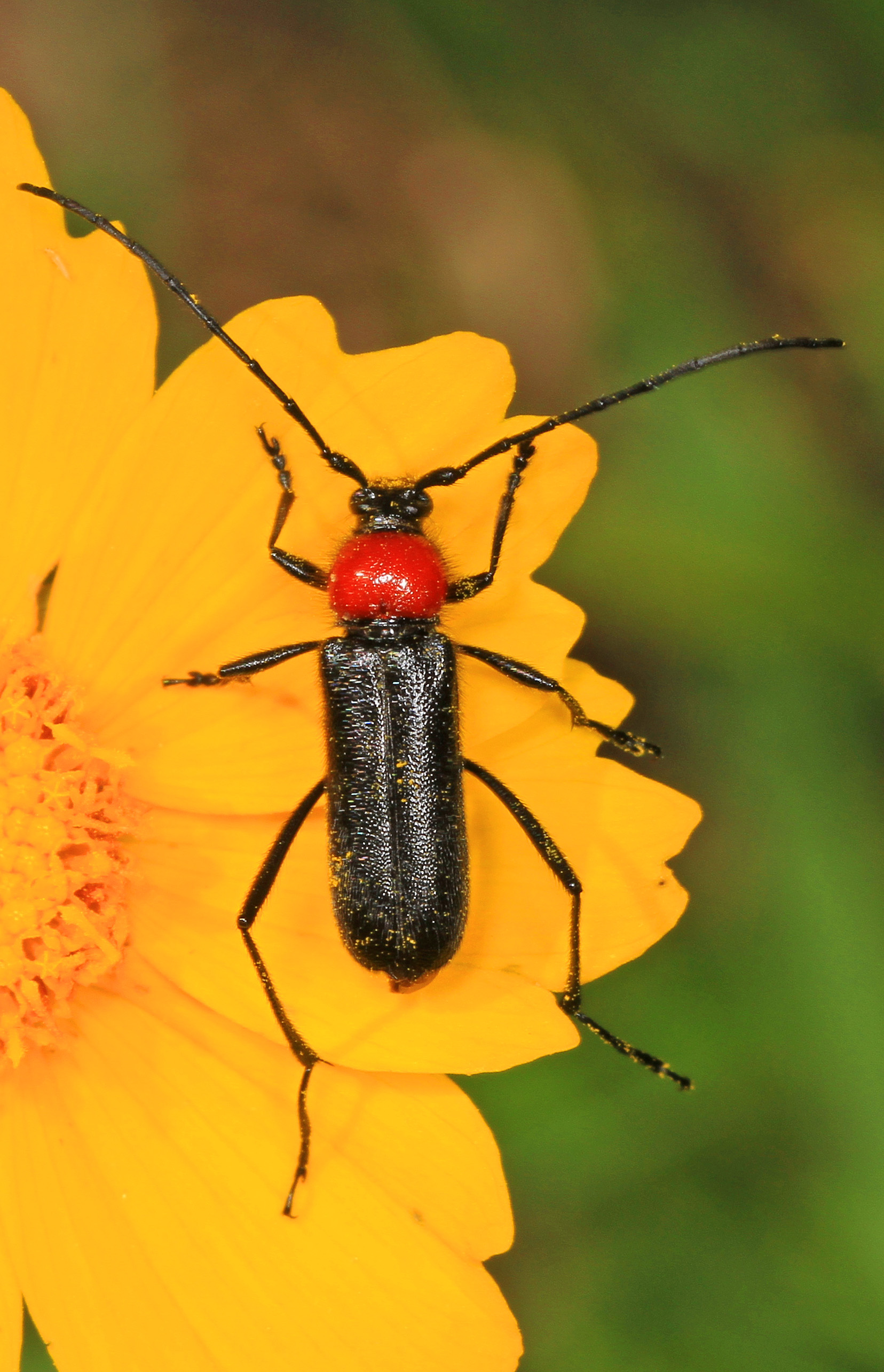

Scientific classification
- Domain: Eukaryota
- Kingdom: Animalia
- Phylum: Arthropoda
- Class: Insecta
- Order: Coleoptera
- Suborder: Polyphaga
- Infraorder: Cucujiformia
- Family: Cerambycidae
- Genus: Batyle
- Species: B. ignicollis

Binomial name
- Batyle ignicollis (Say, 1824)

= Batyle ignicollis =

Species of beetle

Batyle ignicollis is a species of beetle in the family Cerambycidae. It was described by Say in 1824.
