= Batyle rufiventris =

Scientific classification
- Domain: Eukaryota
- Kingdom: Animalia
- Phylum: Arthropoda
- Class: Insecta
- Order: Coleoptera
- Suborder: Polyphaga
- Infraorder: Cucujiformia
- Family: Cerambycidae
- Genus: Batyle
- Species: B. rufiventris

Binomial name
- Batyle rufiventris Knull, 1928

Species of beetle

Batyle rufiventris is a species of beetle in the family Cerambycidae. It was described by Knull in 1928.
