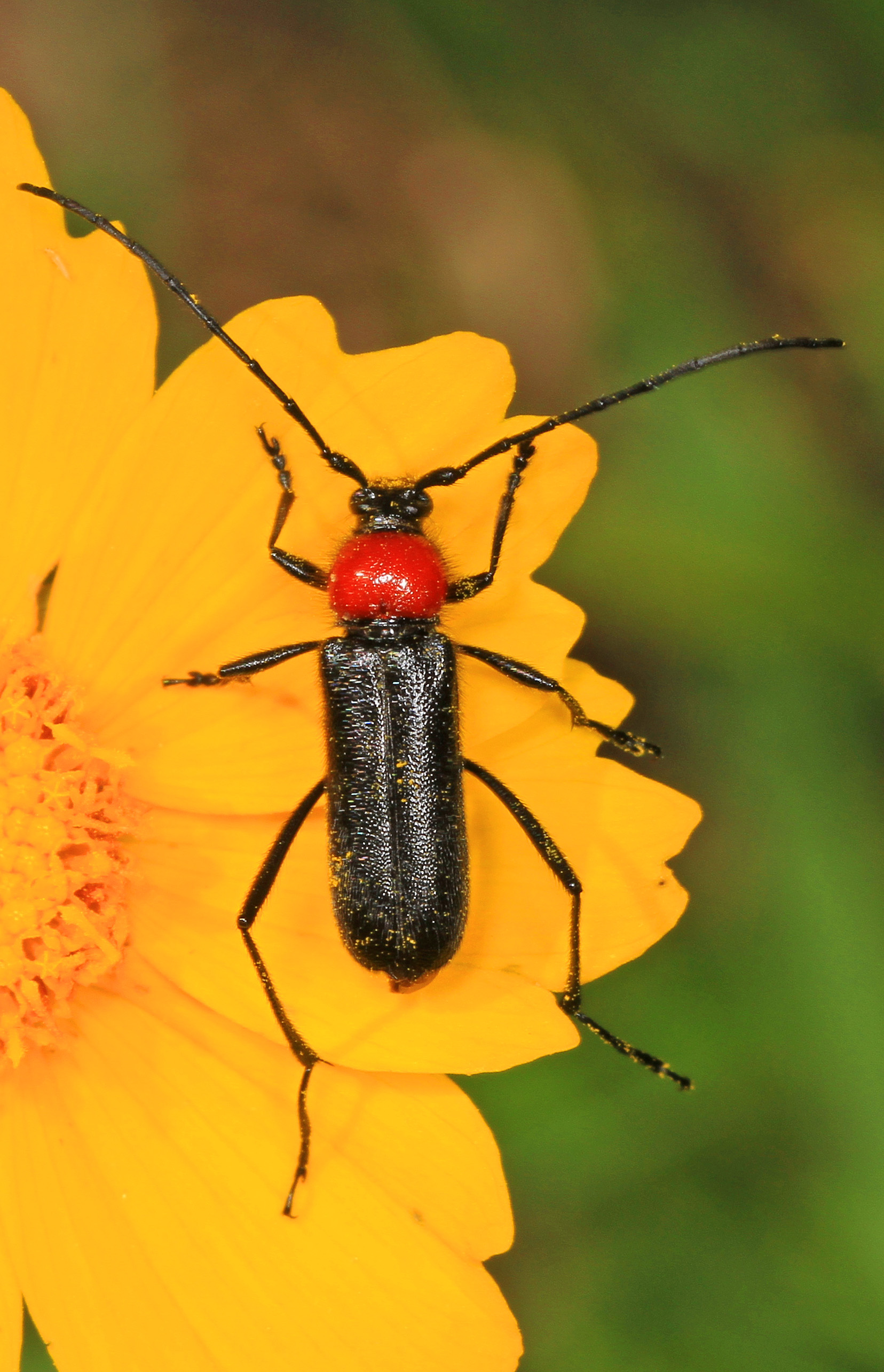
- Batyle ignicollis

Scientific classification
- Kingdom: Animalia
- Phylum: Arthropoda
- Class: Insecta
- Order: Coleoptera
- Suborder: Polyphaga
- Infraorder: Cucujiformia
- Family: Cerambycidae
- Subfamily: Cerambycinae
- Tribe: Trachyderini
- Genus: Batyle; Thomson, 1864

= Batyle =

Genus of beetles

Batyle is a genus of beetles in the family Cerambycidae, containing the following species:

- Batyle ignicollis (Say, 1824)
- Batyle knowltoni Knull, 1968
- Batyle laevicollis Bates, 1892
- Batyle rufiventris Knull, 1928
- Batyle suturalis (Say, 1824)
