= Stenaspis plagiata =

Scientific classification
- Domain: Eukaryota
- Kingdom: Animalia
- Phylum: Arthropoda
- Class: Insecta
- Order: Coleoptera
- Suborder: Polyphaga
- Infraorder: Cucujiformia
- Family: Cerambycidae
- Genus: Stenaspis
- Species: S. plagiata

Binomial name
- Stenaspis plagiata Waterhouse, 1877

Species of beetle

Stenaspis plagiata is a species of beetle in the family Cerambycidae. It was described by Waterhouse in 1877.
