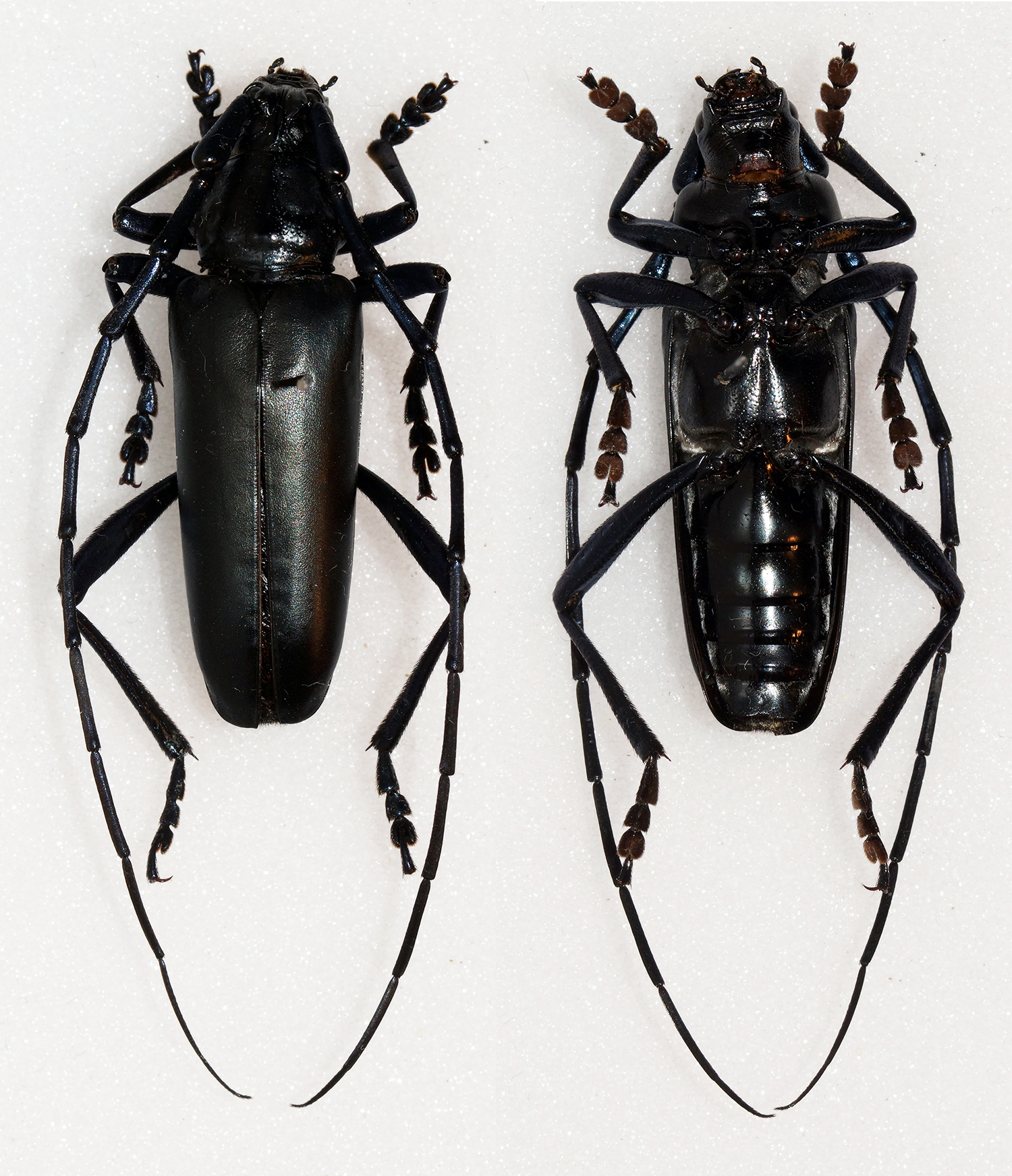
- Stenaspis solitaria

Scientific classification
- Domain: Eukaryota
- Kingdom: Animalia
- Phylum: Arthropoda
- Class: Insecta
- Order: Coleoptera
- Suborder: Polyphaga
- Infraorder: Cucujiformia
- Family: Cerambycidae
- Tribe: Trachyderini
- Genus: Stenaspis; Audinet-Serville, 1834

= Stenaspis =

Genus of beetles

Stenaspis is a genus of beetles in the family Cerambycidae, containing the following species:

- Stenaspis castaneipennis Dupont, 1838
- Stenaspis pilosella Bates, 1892
- Stenaspis plagiata Waterhouse, 1877
- Stenaspis solitaria (Say, 1824)
- Stenaspis superba Aurivillius, 1908
- Stenaspis validicornis Casey, 1912
- Stenaspis verticalis Audinet-Serville, 1834
