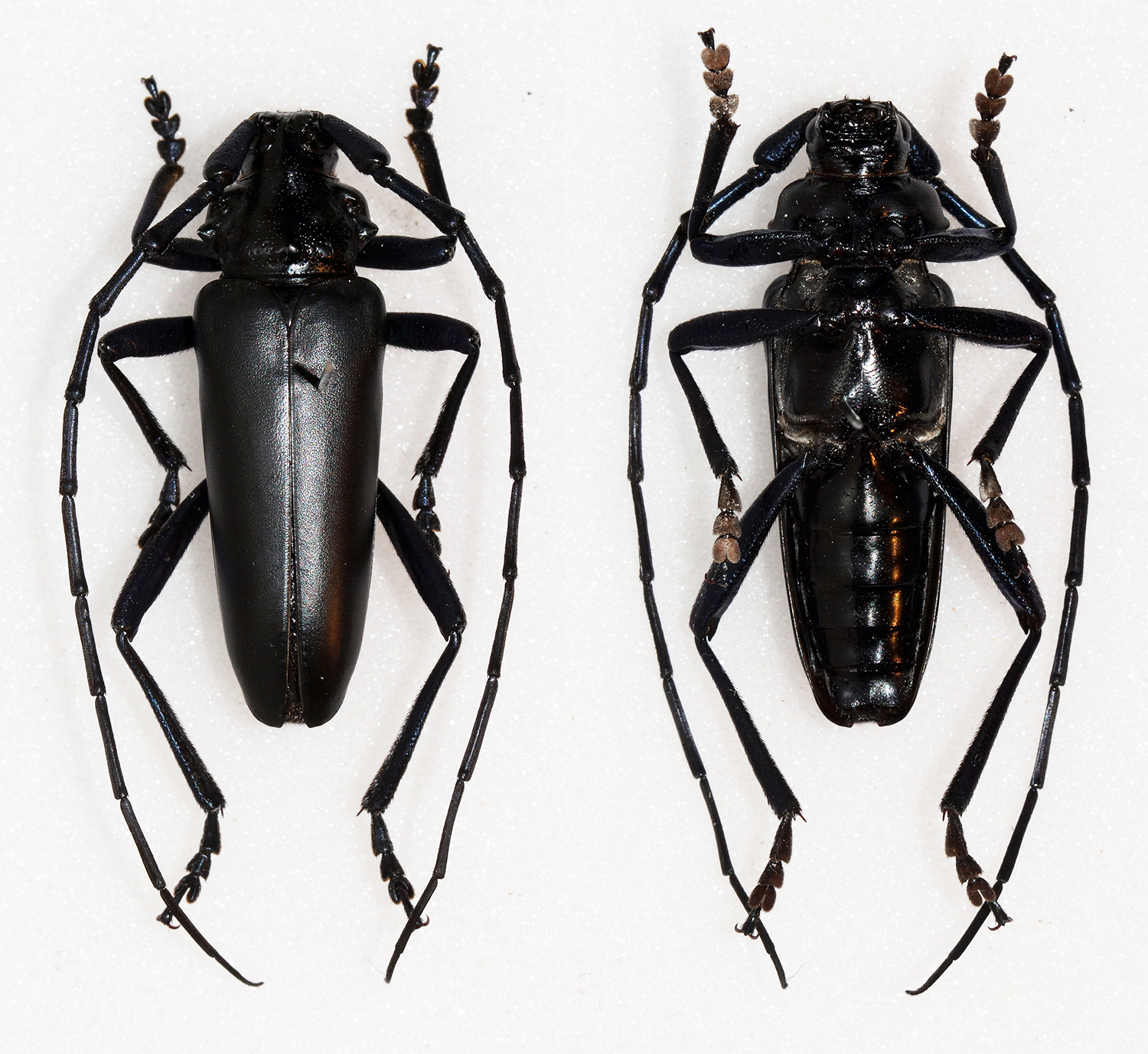

Scientific classification
- Domain: Eukaryota
- Kingdom: Animalia
- Phylum: Arthropoda
- Class: Insecta
- Order: Coleoptera
- Suborder: Polyphaga
- Infraorder: Cucujiformia
- Family: Cerambycidae
- Genus: Stenaspis
- Species: S. solitaria

Binomial name
- Stenaspis solitaria (Say, 1824)

= Stenaspis solitaria =

Species of beetle

Stenaspis solitaria is a species of beetle in the family Cerambycidae. It was described by Say in 1824.
