= Stenaspis validicornis =

Scientific classification
- Kingdom: Animalia
- Phylum: Arthropoda
- Class: Insecta
- Order: Coleoptera
- Suborder: Polyphaga
- Infraorder: Cucujiformia
- Family: Cerambycidae
- Genus: Stenaspis
- Species: S. validicornis

Binomial name
- Stenaspis validicornis Casey, 1912

Species of beetle

Stenaspis validicornis is a species of beetle in the family Cerambycidae. It was described by Casey in 1912.
