= Stenaspis verticalis =

Scientific classification
- Domain: Eukaryota
- Kingdom: Animalia
- Phylum: Arthropoda
- Class: Insecta
- Order: Coleoptera
- Suborder: Polyphaga
- Infraorder: Cucujiformia
- Family: Cerambycidae
- Genus: Stenaspis
- Species: S. verticalis

Binomial name
- Stenaspis verticalis Audinet-Serville, 1834

Species of beetle

Stenaspis verticalis is a species of beetle in the family Cerambycidae. It was described by Audinet-Serville in 1834.
