= Stenaspis pilosella =

Scientific classification
- Domain: Eukaryota
- Kingdom: Animalia
- Phylum: Arthropoda
- Class: Insecta
- Order: Coleoptera
- Suborder: Polyphaga
- Infraorder: Cucujiformia
- Family: Cerambycidae
- Genus: Stenaspis
- Species: S. pilosella

Binomial name
- Stenaspis pilosella Bates, 1892

Species of beetle

Stenaspis pilosella is a species of beetle in the family Cerambycidae. It was described by Bates in 1892.
