= Ceralocyna nigropilosa =

Scientific classification
- Domain: Eukaryota
- Kingdom: Animalia
- Phylum: Arthropoda
- Class: Insecta
- Order: Coleoptera
- Suborder: Polyphaga
- Infraorder: Cucujiformia
- Family: Cerambycidae
- Genus: Ceralocyna
- Species: C. nigropilosa

Binomial name
- Ceralocyna nigropilosa Monné & Napp, 1999

Species of beetle

Ceralocyna nigropilosa is a species of beetle in the family Cerambycidae. It was described by Monné & Napp in 1999.
