= Ceralocyna aliciae =

Scientific classification
- Domain: Eukaryota
- Kingdom: Animalia
- Phylum: Arthropoda
- Class: Insecta
- Order: Coleoptera
- Suborder: Polyphaga
- Infraorder: Cucujiformia
- Family: Cerambycidae
- Genus: Ceralocyna
- Species: C. aliciae

Binomial name
- Ceralocyna aliciae Hovore & Chemsak, 2005

Species of beetle

Ceralocyna aliciae is a species of beetle in the family Cerambycidae. It was described by Hovore & Chemsak in 2005.
