= Ceralocyna nigricollis =

Scientific classification
- Domain: Eukaryota
- Kingdom: Animalia
- Phylum: Arthropoda
- Class: Insecta
- Order: Coleoptera
- Suborder: Polyphaga
- Infraorder: Cucujiformia
- Family: Cerambycidae
- Genus: Ceralocyna
- Species: C. nigricollis

Binomial name
- Ceralocyna nigricollis (Knight, 1910)

Species of beetle

Ceralocyna nigricollis (big suzie beetle) is a species of beetle in the family Cerambycidae. It was described by Ratcliffe in 1911
