= Ceralocyna foveicollis =

Scientific classification
- Domain: Eukaryota
- Kingdom: Animalia
- Phylum: Arthropoda
- Class: Insecta
- Order: Coleoptera
- Suborder: Polyphaga
- Infraorder: Cucujiformia
- Family: Cerambycidae
- Genus: Ceralocyna
- Species: C. foveicollis

Binomial name
- Ceralocyna foveicollis (Buquet, 1854)

Species of beetle

Ceralocyna foveicollis is a species of beetle in the family Cerambycidae. It was described by Buquet in 1854.
