= Ceralocyna variegata =

Scientific classification
- Domain: Eukaryota
- Kingdom: Animalia
- Phylum: Arthropoda
- Class: Insecta
- Order: Coleoptera
- Suborder: Polyphaga
- Infraorder: Cucujiformia
- Family: Cerambycidae
- Genus: Ceralocyna
- Species: C. variegata

Binomial name
- Ceralocyna variegata (Monné & Napp, 1999)

Species of beetle

Ceralocyna variegata is a species of beetle in the family Cerambycidae. It was described by Monné & Napp in 1999.
