= Ceralocyna terminata =

Scientific classification
- Domain: Eukaryota
- Kingdom: Animalia
- Phylum: Arthropoda
- Class: Insecta
- Order: Coleoptera
- Suborder: Polyphaga
- Infraorder: Cucujiformia
- Family: Cerambycidae
- Genus: Ceralocyna
- Species: C. terminata

Binomial name
- Ceralocyna terminata (Buquet, 1854)

Species of beetle

Ceralocyna terminata is a species of beetle in the family Cerambycidae. It was described by Buquet in 1854.
