= Ceralocyna seticornis =

Scientific classification
- Domain: Eukaryota
- Kingdom: Animalia
- Phylum: Arthropoda
- Class: Insecta
- Order: Coleoptera
- Suborder: Polyphaga
- Infraorder: Cucujiformia
- Family: Cerambycidae
- Genus: Ceralocyna
- Species: C. seticornis

Binomial name
- Ceralocyna seticornis Bates, 1870

Species of beetle

Ceralocyna seticornis is a species of beetle in the family Cerambycidae. It was described by Henry Walter Bates in 1870.
