= Ceralocyna =

Scientific classification
- Domain: Eukaryota
- Kingdom: Animalia
- Phylum: Arthropoda
- Class: Insecta
- Order: Coleoptera
- Suborder: Polyphaga
- Infraorder: Cucujiformia
- Family: Cerambycidae
- Subfamily: Cerambycinae
- Tribe: Trachyderini
- Genus: Ceralocyna; Viana, 1971

Genus of beetles

Ceralocyna is a genus of beetles in the family Cerambycidae, containing the following species:

- Ceralocyna aliciae Hovore & Chemsak, 2005
- Ceralocyna amabilis Monné & Napp, 1999
- Ceralocyna coccinea Monné & Napp, 1999
- Ceralocyna cribricollis (Bates, 1885)
- Ceralocyna foveicollis (Buquet, 1854)
- Ceralocyna fulvipes Viana, 1971
- Ceralocyna marcelae Hovore & Chemsak, 2005
- Ceralocyna margareteae Martins & Galileo, 1994
- Ceralocyna militaris (Gounelle, 1911)
- Ceralocyna nigricollis (Ratcliffe, 1911)
- Ceralocyna nigricornis (Gounelle, 1911)
- Ceralocyna nigropilosa Monné & Napp, 1999
- Ceralocyna onorei Hovore & Chemsak, 2005
- Ceralocyna parkeri (Chemsak, 1964)
- Ceralocyna seticornis (Bates, 1870)
- Ceralocyna terminata (Buquet, 1854)
- Ceralocyna variegata Monné & Napp, 1999
- Ceralocyna venusta Martins & Galileo, 2010
