= Ceralocyna militaris =

Scientific classification
- Domain: Eukaryota
- Kingdom: Animalia
- Phylum: Arthropoda
- Class: Insecta
- Order: Coleoptera
- Suborder: Polyphaga
- Infraorder: Cucujiformia
- Family: Cerambycidae
- Genus: Ceralocyna
- Species: C. militaris

Binomial name
- Ceralocyna militaris (Gounelle, 1911)

Species of beetle

Ceralocyna militaris is a species of beetle in the family Cerambycidae. It was described by Gounelle in 1911.
