= Ceralocyna parkeri =

Scientific classification
- Domain: Eukaryota
- Kingdom: Animalia
- Phylum: Arthropoda
- Class: Insecta
- Order: Coleoptera
- Suborder: Polyphaga
- Infraorder: Cucujiformia
- Family: Cerambycidae
- Genus: Ceralocyna
- Species: C. parkeri

Binomial name
- Ceralocyna parkeri Chemsak, 1964

Species of beetle

Ceralocyna parkeri is a species of beetle in the family Cerambycidae. It was described by Chemsak in 1964.
