= Ceragenia leprieurii =

Scientific classification
- Domain: Eukaryota
- Kingdom: Animalia
- Phylum: Arthropoda
- Class: Insecta
- Order: Coleoptera
- Suborder: Polyphaga
- Infraorder: Cucujiformia
- Family: Cerambycidae
- Genus: Ceragenia
- Species: C. leprieurii

Binomial name
- Ceragenia leprieurii Buquet, 1844

Species of beetle

Ceragenia leprieurii is a species of beetle in the family Cerambycidae. It was described by Buquet in 1844.
