= Ceragenia insulana =

Scientific classification
- Domain: Eukaryota
- Kingdom: Animalia
- Phylum: Arthropoda
- Class: Insecta
- Order: Coleoptera
- Suborder: Polyphaga
- Infraorder: Cucujiformia
- Family: Cerambycidae
- Genus: Ceragenia
- Species: C. insulana

Binomial name
- Ceragenia insulana Fisher, 1943

Species of beetle

Ceragenia insulana is a species of beetle in the family Cerambycidae. It was described by Fisher in 1943.
