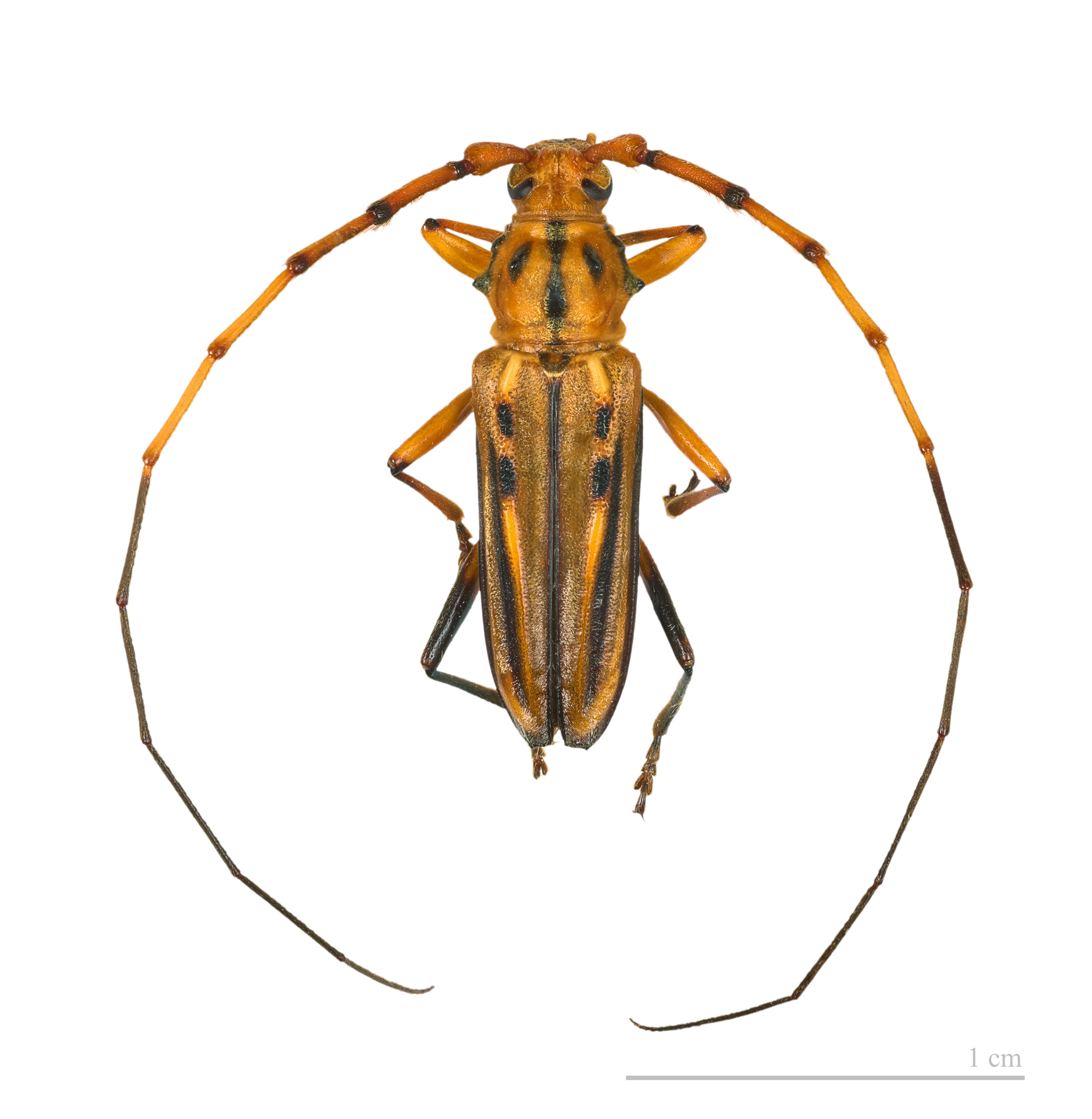
- Ceragenia bicornis

Scientific classification
- Domain: Eukaryota
- Kingdom: Animalia
- Phylum: Arthropoda
- Class: Insecta
- Order: Coleoptera
- Suborder: Polyphaga
- Infraorder: Cucujiformia
- Family: Cerambycidae
- Subfamily: Cerambycinae
- Tribe: Trachyderini
- Genus: Ceragenia; Audinet-Serville, 1834

= Ceragenia =

Genus of beetles

Ceragenia is a genus of beetles in the family Cerambycidae, containing the following species:

- Ceragenia aurulenta Monné & Martins, 1991
- Ceragenia bicornis (Fabricius, 1801)
- Ceragenia insulana Fisher, 1943
- Ceragenia leprieurii Buquet in Guérin-Méneville, 1844
