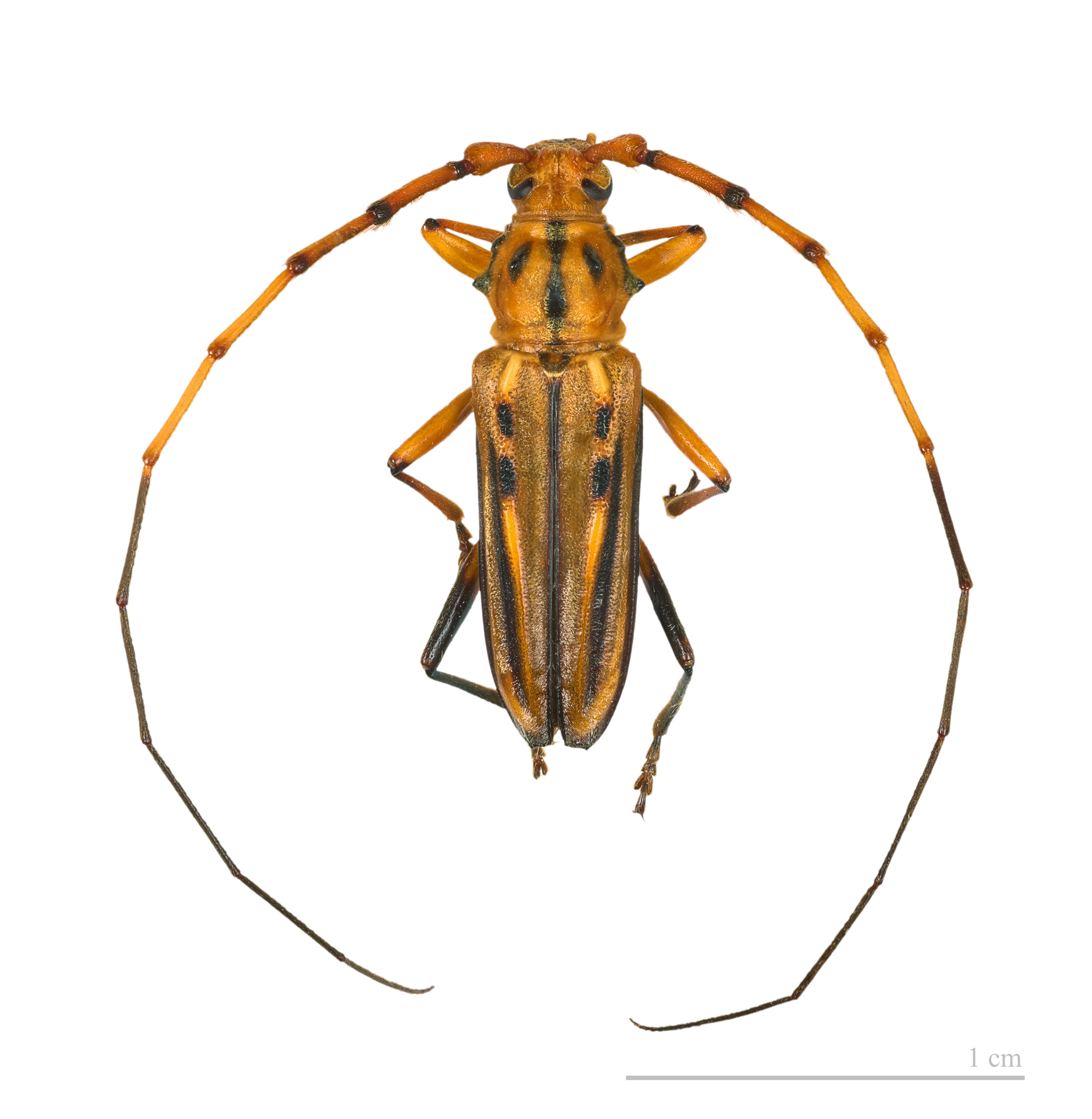
- Male Ceragenia bicornis

Scientific classification
- Kingdom: Animalia
- Phylum: Arthropoda
- Class: Insecta
- Order: Coleoptera
- Suborder: Polyphaga
- Infraorder: Cucujiformia
- Family: Cerambycidae
- Genus: Ceragenia
- Species: C. bicornis

Binomial name
- Ceragenia bicornis (Fabricus, 1801)

= Ceragenia bicornis =

Species of beetle

Ceragenia bicornis is a species of beetle in the family Cerambycidae. It was described by Fabricus in 1801.
