= Ceragenia aurulenta =

Scientific classification
- Domain: Eukaryota
- Kingdom: Animalia
- Phylum: Arthropoda
- Class: Insecta
- Order: Coleoptera
- Suborder: Polyphaga
- Infraorder: Cucujiformia
- Family: Cerambycidae
- Genus: Ceragenia
- Species: C. aurulenta

Binomial name
- Ceragenia aurulenta Monné & Martins, 1991

Species of beetle

Ceragenia aurulenta is a species of beetle in the family Cerambycidae. It was described by Monné & Martins in 1991.

Information about its precise habitat preferences is limited, yet other longhorn beetles in the Ceragenia genus are often found in association with wooded areas.
