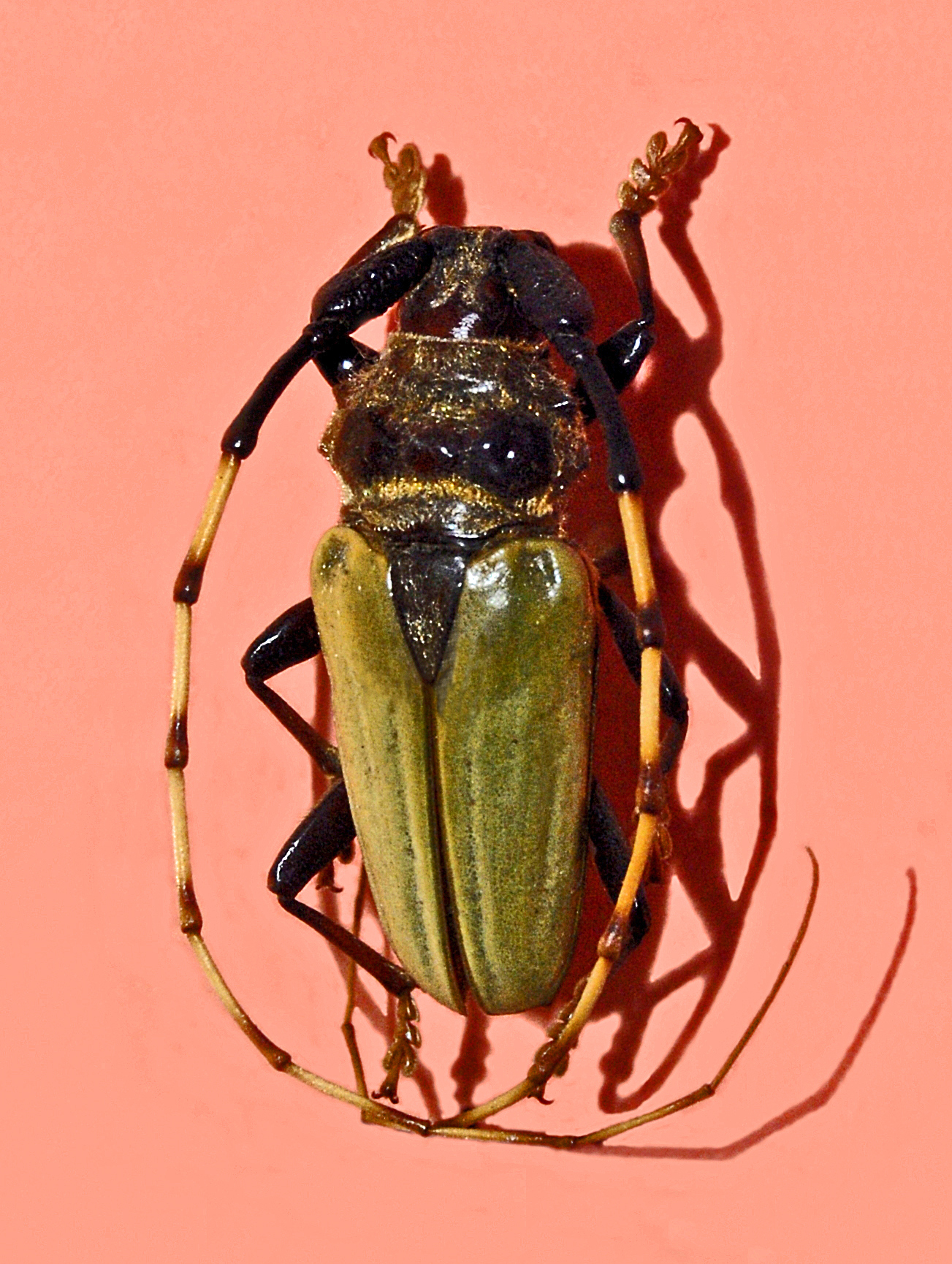
- Museum specimen of Ancylosternus morio

Scientific classification
- Kingdom: Animalia
- Phylum: Arthropoda
- Class: Insecta
- Order: Coleoptera
- Suborder: Polyphaga
- Infraorder: Cucujiformia
- Family: Cerambycidae
- Genus: Ancylosternus
- Species: A. morio

Binomial name
- Ancylosternus morio (Fabricius, 1787)

Synonyms
- Cerambyx morio Fabricius, 1787; Cerambyx scutellaris Olivier, 1795; Trachyderes morio (Fabricius) Dalman in Schönherr, 1817; Trachyderes scutellaris (Olivier) Dalman in Schönherr, 1817

= Ancylosternus morio =

Species of beetle

Ancylosternus morio is a species of beetle in the family Cerambycidae. It was described by Johan Christian Fabricius in 1787.

== Subspecies ==
- Ancylosternus morio albicornis Erichson, 1847
- Ancylosternus morio morio (Fabricius, 1787)

== Distribution ==
This species can be found in Bolivia, Brazil, Colombia, French Guiana, Peru and Venezuela.
