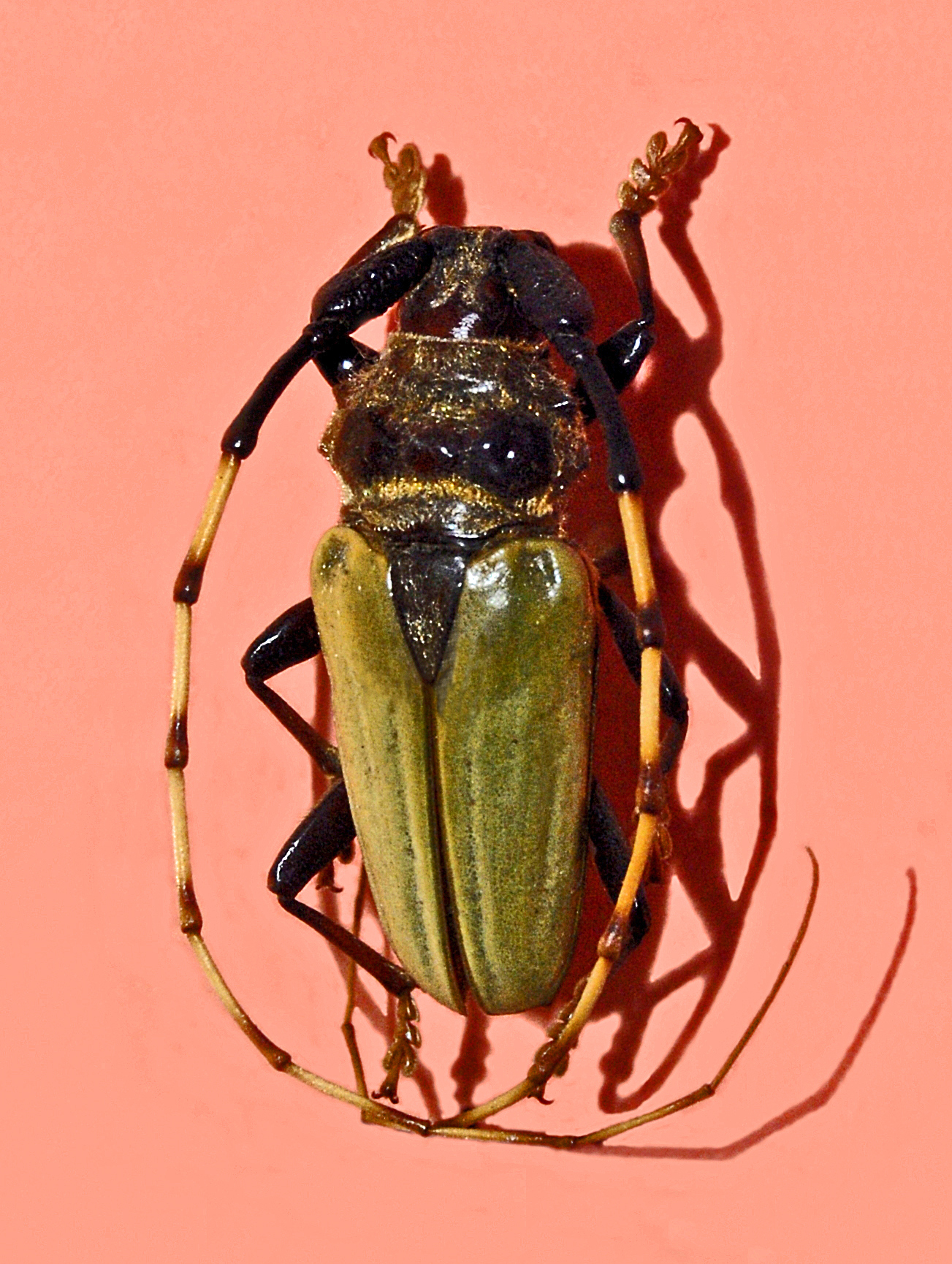
- Museum specimen of Ancylosternus morio

Scientific classification
- Domain: Eukaryota
- Kingdom: Animalia
- Phylum: Arthropoda
- Class: Insecta
- Order: Coleoptera
- Suborder: Polyphaga
- Infraorder: Cucujiformia
- Family: Cerambycidae
- Subfamily: Cerambycinae
- Tribe: Trachyderini
- Genus: Ancylosternus; Dupont in Audinet-Serville, 1834

= Ancylosternus =

Genus of beetles

Ancylosternus is a genus of beetles in the family Cerambycidae, containing the following species:

- Ancylosternus annulicorne Martins & Galileo, 2010
- Ancylosternus morio (Fabricius, 1787)
