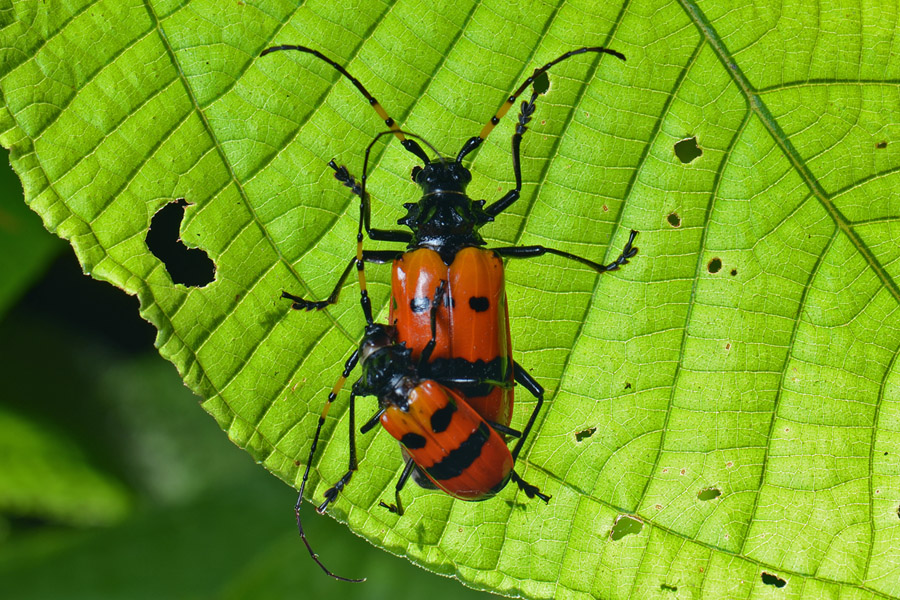
- Sternacanthus picticornis

Scientific classification
- Domain: Eukaryota
- Kingdom: Animalia
- Phylum: Arthropoda
- Class: Insecta
- Order: Coleoptera
- Suborder: Polyphaga
- Infraorder: Cucujiformia
- Family: Cerambycidae
- Subfamily: Cerambycinae
- Tribe: Trachyderini
- Genus: Sternacanthus; Audinet-Serville, 1832

= Sternacanthus =

Genus of beetle

Sternacanthus is a genus of beetles in the family Cerambycidae, containing the following species:

- Sternacanthus allstoni Bates, 1870
- Sternacanthus batesi Pascoe, 1862
- Sternacanthus picicornis Thomson, 1860
- Sternacanthus picticornis Pascoe, 1857
- Sternacanthus sexmaculatus Bates, 1870
- Sternacanthus undatus (Olivier, 1795)
- Sternacanthus unifasciatus Aurivillius, 1922
