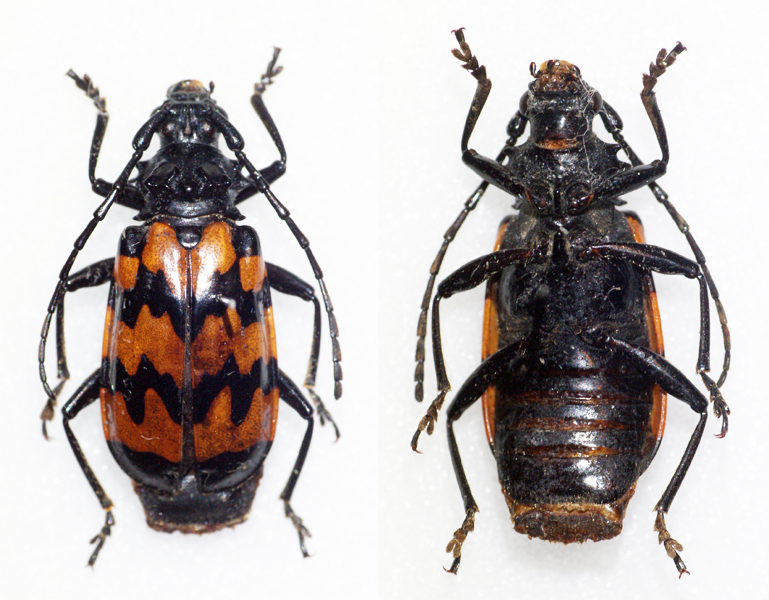

Scientific classification
- Kingdom: Animalia
- Phylum: Arthropoda
- Clade: Pancrustacea
- Class: Insecta
- Order: Coleoptera
- Suborder: Polyphaga
- Infraorder: Cucujiformia
- Family: Cerambycidae
- Genus: Sternacanthus
- Species: S. undatus

Binomial name
- Sternacanthus undatus (Olivier, 1795)

= Sternacanthus undatus =

Species of beetle

Sternacanthus undatus is a species of beetle in the family Cerambycidae. It was described by Oliver in 1795.
