= Sternacanthus sexmaculatus =

Scientific classification
- Domain: Eukaryota
- Kingdom: Animalia
- Phylum: Arthropoda
- Class: Insecta
- Order: Coleoptera
- Suborder: Polyphaga
- Infraorder: Cucujiformia
- Family: Cerambycidae
- Genus: Sternacanthus
- Species: S. sexmaculatus

Binomial name
- Sternacanthus sexmaculatus Bates, 1870

Species of beetle

Sternacanthus sexmaculatus is a species of beetle in the family Cerambycidae. It was described by Bates in 1870.
