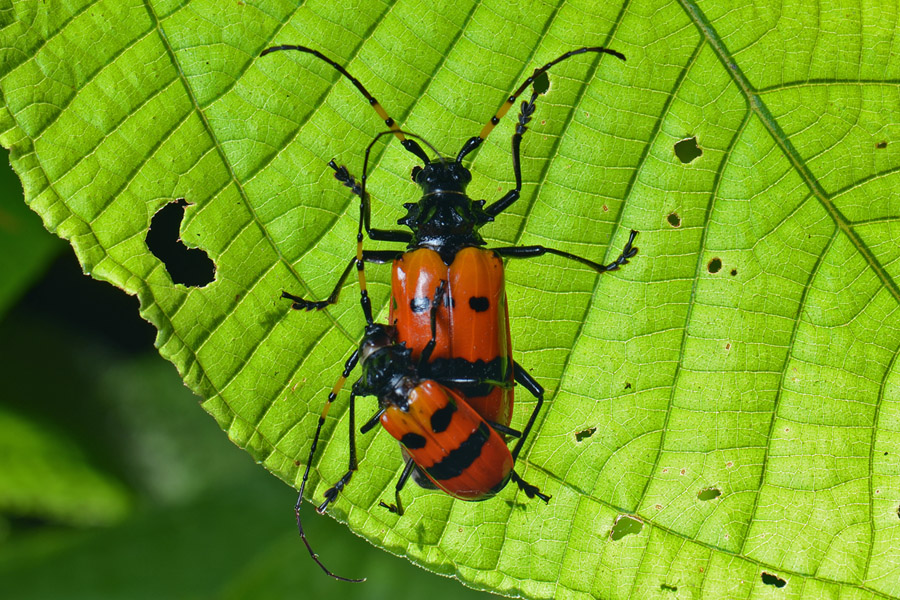

Scientific classification
- Domain: Eukaryota
- Kingdom: Animalia
- Phylum: Arthropoda
- Class: Insecta
- Order: Coleoptera
- Suborder: Polyphaga
- Infraorder: Cucujiformia
- Family: Cerambycidae
- Genus: Sternacanthus
- Species: S. picticornis

Binomial name
- Sternacanthus picticornis Pascoe, 1857

= Sternacanthus picticornis =

Species of beetle

Sternacanthus picticornis is a species of beetle in the family Cerambycidae. It was described by Pascoe in 1857.
