= Sternacanthus allstoni =

Scientific classification
- Domain: Eukaryota
- Kingdom: Animalia
- Phylum: Arthropoda
- Class: Insecta
- Order: Coleoptera
- Suborder: Polyphaga
- Infraorder: Cucujiformia
- Family: Cerambycidae
- Genus: Sternacanthus
- Species: S. allstoni

Binomial name
- Sternacanthus allstoni Bates, 1870

Species of beetle

Sternacanthus allstoni is a species of beetle in the family Cerambycidae. It was described by Henry Walter Bates in 1870.
