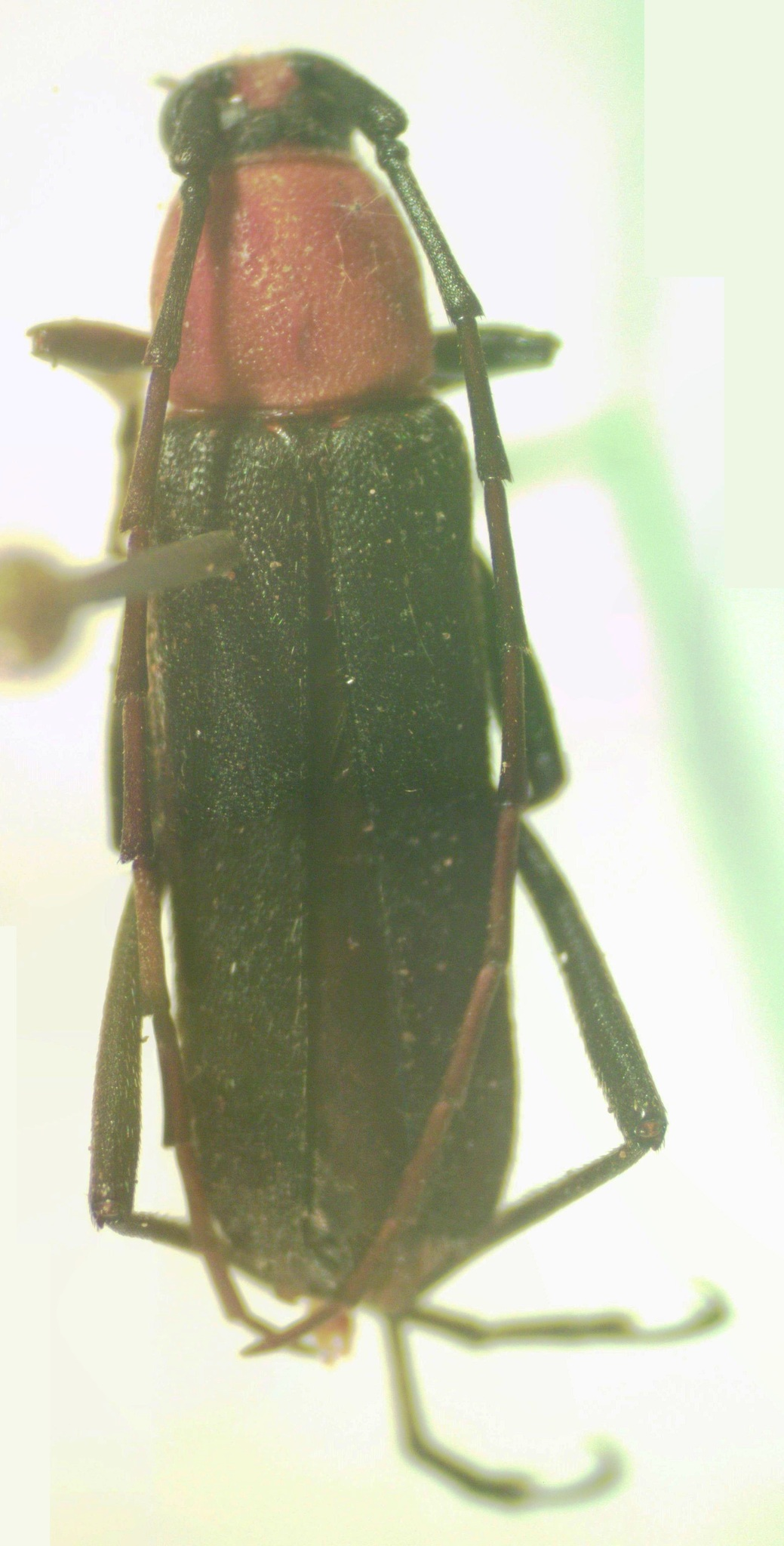

Scientific classification
- Kingdom: Animalia
- Phylum: Arthropoda
- Clade: Pancrustacea
- Class: Insecta
- Order: Coleoptera
- Suborder: Polyphaga
- Infraorder: Cucujiformia
- Family: Cerambycidae
- Genus: Axestoleus
- Species: A. meridionalis

Binomial name
- Axestoleus meridionalis (Bates, 1880)

= Axestoleus meridionalis =

Species of beetle

Axestoleus meridionalis is a species of beetle in the family Cerambycidae. It was described by Henry Walter Bates in 1880.
