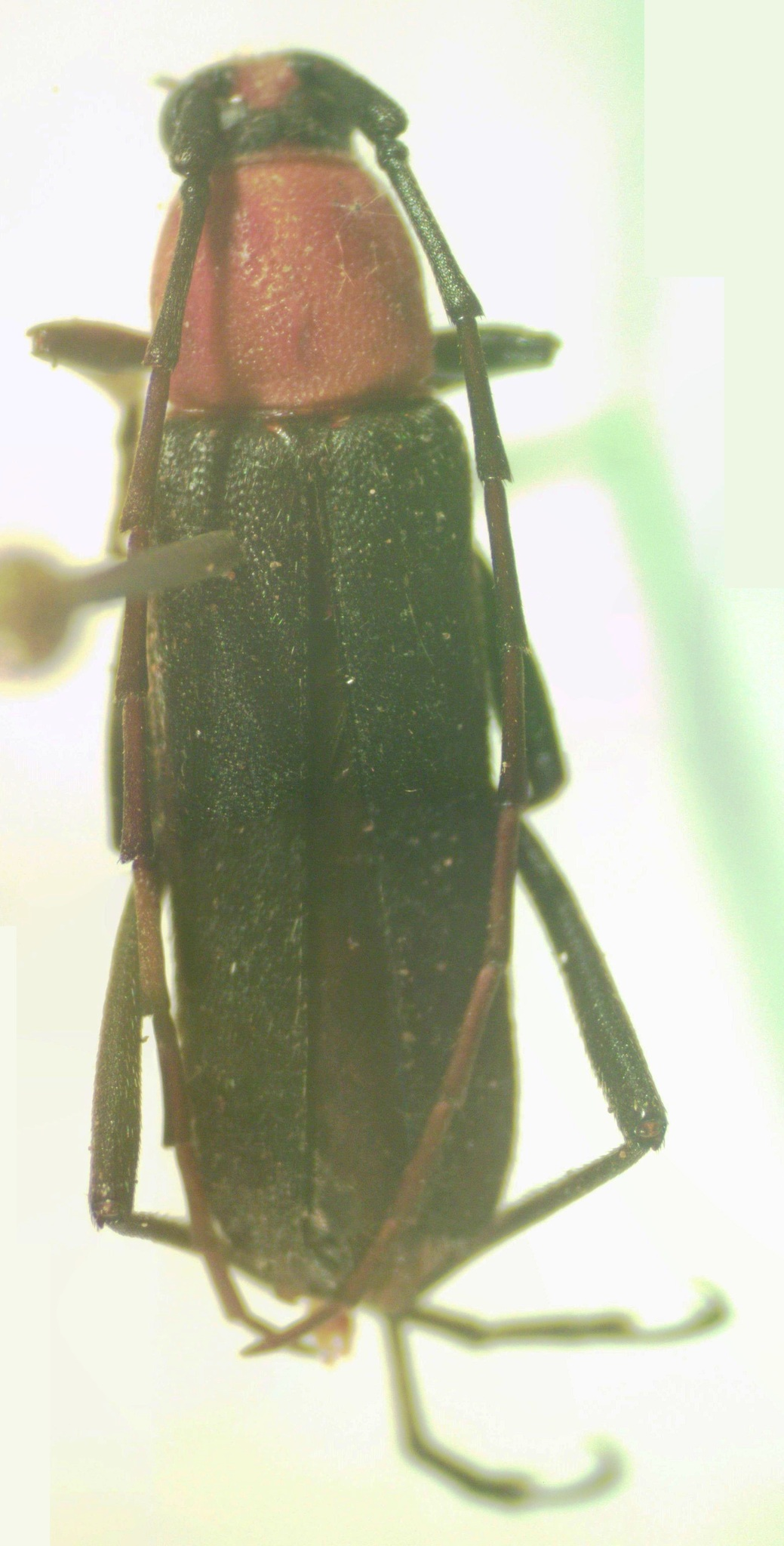
- Axestoleus meridionalis

Scientific classification
- Kingdom: Animalia
- Phylum: Arthropoda
- Clade: Pancrustacea
- Class: Insecta
- Order: Coleoptera
- Suborder: Polyphaga
- Infraorder: Cucujiformia
- Family: Cerambycidae
- Subfamily: Cerambycinae
- Tribe: Trachyderini
- Genus: Axestoleus; Bates, 1892

= Axestoleus =

Genus of beetles

Axestoleus is a genus of beetles in the family Cerambycidae, containing the following species:

- Axestoleus meridionalis (Bates, 1880)
- Axestoleus quinquepunctatus Bates, 1892
