= Callona basilea =

Scientific classification
- Domain: Eukaryota
- Kingdom: Animalia
- Phylum: Arthropoda
- Class: Insecta
- Order: Coleoptera
- Suborder: Polyphaga
- Infraorder: Cucujiformia
- Family: Cerambycidae
- Genus: Callona
- Species: C. basilea

Binomial name
- Callona basilea (Bates, 1880)

Species of beetle

Callona basilea is a species of beetle in the family Cerambycidae. It was described by Bates in 1880.
