= Callona tricolor =

Scientific classification
- Domain: Eukaryota
- Kingdom: Animalia
- Phylum: Arthropoda
- Class: Insecta
- Order: Coleoptera
- Suborder: Polyphaga
- Infraorder: Cucujiformia
- Family: Cerambycidae
- Genus: Callona
- Species: C. tricolor

Binomial name
- Callona tricolor G. R. Waterhouse, 1840

Species of beetle

Callona tricolor is a species of beetle in the family Cerambycidae. It was described by G. R. Waterhouse in 1840.
