= Callona rimosa =

Scientific classification
- Domain: Eukaryota
- Kingdom: Animalia
- Phylum: Arthropoda
- Class: Insecta
- Order: Coleoptera
- Suborder: Polyphaga
- Infraorder: Cucujiformia
- Family: Cerambycidae
- Genus: Callona
- Species: C. rimosa

Binomial name
- Callona rimosa (Buquet, 1940)

Species of beetle

Callona rimosa is a species of beetle in the family Cerambycidae. It was described by Buquet in 1940.
