= Callona praestans =

Scientific classification
- Kingdom: Animalia
- Phylum: Arthropoda
- Class: Insecta
- Order: Coleoptera
- Suborder: Polyphaga
- Infraorder: Cucujiformia
- Family: Cerambycidae
- Genus: Callona
- Species: C. praestans

Binomial name
- Callona praestans (Casey, 1912)

Species of beetle

Callona praestans is a species of beetle in the family Cerambycidae. It was described by Casey in 1912.
