= Callona rutilans =

Scientific classification
- Domain: Eukaryota
- Kingdom: Animalia
- Phylum: Arthropoda
- Class: Insecta
- Order: Coleoptera
- Suborder: Polyphaga
- Infraorder: Cucujiformia
- Family: Cerambycidae
- Genus: Callona
- Species: C. rutilans

Binomial name
- Callona rutilans (Bates, 1869)

Species of beetle

Callona rutilans is a species of beetle in the family Cerambycidae. It was described by Bates in 1869.
