= Callona =

Scientific classification
- Domain: Eukaryota
- Kingdom: Animalia
- Phylum: Arthropoda
- Class: Insecta
- Order: Coleoptera
- Suborder: Polyphaga
- Infraorder: Cucujiformia
- Family: Cerambycidae
- Subfamily: Cerambycinae
- Tribe: Trachyderini
- Genus: Callona; Waterhouse, 1840

Genus of beetles

Callona is a genus of beetles in the family Cerambycidae, containing the following species:

- Callona basilea (Bates, 1880)
- Callona championi (Bates, 1885)
- Callona flavofasciata Chemsak & Hovore, in Eya & Tyson, 2011
- Callona iridescens (White, 1853)
- Callona lampros (Bates, 1885)
- Callona praestans (Casey, 1912)
- Callona rimosa (Buquet, 1840)
- Callona rutilans (Bates, 1869)
- Callona thoracica (White, 1853)
- Callona tricolor G. R. Waterhouse, 1840
