= Callona flavofasciata =

Scientific classification
- Kingdom: Animalia
- Phylum: Arthropoda
- Class: Insecta
- Order: Coleoptera
- Suborder: Polyphaga
- Infraorder: Cucujiformia
- Family: Cerambycidae
- Genus: Callona
- Species: C. flavofasciata

Binomial name
- Callona flavofasciata Chemsak & Hovore, 2011

Species of beetle

Callona flavofasciata is a species of beetle in the family Cerambycidae. It was described by Chemsak & Hovore in 2011. The species was first discovered in Costa Rica.
