= Callona championi =

Scientific classification
- Domain: Eukaryota
- Kingdom: Animalia
- Phylum: Arthropoda
- Class: Insecta
- Order: Coleoptera
- Suborder: Polyphaga
- Infraorder: Cucujiformia
- Family: Cerambycidae
- Genus: Callona
- Species: C. championi

Binomial name
- Callona championi (Bates, 1885)

Species of beetle

Callona championi is a species of beetle in the family Cerambycidae. It was first seen and described by Bates in 1885.
