= Lophalia =

Scientific classification
- Kingdom: Animalia
- Phylum: Arthropoda
- Class: Insecta
- Order: Coleoptera
- Suborder: Polyphaga
- Infraorder: Cucujiformia
- Family: Cerambycidae
- Subfamily: Cerambycinae
- Tribe: Trachyderini
- Genus: Lophalia; Casey, 1912

Genus of beetles

Lophalia is a genus of beetles in the family Cerambycidae, containing the following species:

- Lophalia auricomis Chemsak & Linsley, 1979
- Lophalia cavei Chemsak & Hovore, in Eya, 2010
- Lophalia cribricollis (Bates, 1892)
- Lophalia cyanicollis (Dupont, 1838)
- Lophalia prolata Chemsak & Linsley, 1988
- Lophalia quadrivittata (Bates, 1892)
