= Lophalia cribricollis =

Scientific classification
- Domain: Eukaryota
- Kingdom: Animalia
- Phylum: Arthropoda
- Class: Insecta
- Order: Coleoptera
- Suborder: Polyphaga
- Infraorder: Cucujiformia
- Family: Cerambycidae
- Genus: Lophalia
- Species: L. cribricollis

Binomial name
- Lophalia cribricollis (Bates, 1892)

Species of beetle

Lophalia cribricollis is a species of beetle in the family Cerambycidae.

== Background ==
It was described by Bates in 1892.
