= Lophalia quadrivittata =

Scientific classification
- Domain: Eukaryota
- Kingdom: Animalia
- Phylum: Arthropoda
- Class: Insecta
- Order: Coleoptera
- Suborder: Polyphaga
- Infraorder: Cucujiformia
- Family: Cerambycidae
- Genus: Lophalia
- Species: L. quadrivittata

Binomial name
- Lophalia quadrivittata (Bates, 1892)

Species of beetle

Lophalia quadrivittata is a species of beetle in the family Cerambycidae. It was described by Henry Walter Bates in 1892.
