= Lophalia cyanicollis =

Scientific classification
- Domain: Eukaryota
- Kingdom: Animalia
- Phylum: Arthropoda
- Class: Insecta
- Order: Coleoptera
- Suborder: Polyphaga
- Infraorder: Cucujiformia
- Family: Cerambycidae
- Genus: Lophalia
- Species: L. cyanicollis

Binomial name
- Lophalia cyanicollis (Dupont, 1838)

Species of beetle

Lophalia cyanicollis is a species of beetle in the family Cerambycidae. It was described by Dupont in 1838.
