= Zenochloris vandykei =

Scientific classification
- Kingdom: Animalia
- Phylum: Arthropoda
- Class: Insecta
- Order: Coleoptera
- Suborder: Polyphaga
- Infraorder: Cucujiformia
- Family: Cerambycidae
- Genus: Zenochloris
- Species: Z. vandykei

Binomial name
- Zenochloris vandykei Linsley, 1935

Species of beetle

Zenochloris vandykei is a species of beetle in the family Cerambycidae. It was described by Linsley in 1935.
