= Zenochloris major =

Scientific classification
- Kingdom: Animalia
- Phylum: Arthropoda
- Class: Insecta
- Order: Coleoptera
- Suborder: Polyphaga
- Infraorder: Cucujiformia
- Family: Cerambycidae
- Genus: Zenochloris
- Species: Z. major

Binomial name
- Zenochloris major Chemsak & Hovore, 2010

Species of beetle

Zenochloris major is a species of beetle in the family Cerambycidae. It was described by Chemsak & Hovore in 2010.
