= Zenochloris barbicauda =

Scientific classification
- Kingdom: Animalia
- Phylum: Arthropoda
- Class: Insecta
- Order: Coleoptera
- Suborder: Polyphaga
- Infraorder: Cucujiformia
- Family: Cerambycidae
- Genus: Zenochloris
- Species: Z. barbicauda

Binomial name
- Zenochloris barbicauda Bates, 1892

Species of beetle

Zenochloris barbicauda is a species of beetle in the family Cerambycidae. It was described by Bates in 1892.
