= Zenochloris densepunctata =

Scientific classification
- Kingdom: Animalia
- Phylum: Arthropoda
- Class: Insecta
- Order: Coleoptera
- Suborder: Polyphaga
- Infraorder: Cucujiformia
- Family: Cerambycidae
- Genus: Zenochloris
- Species: Z. densepunctata

Binomial name
- Zenochloris densepunctata E. Fuchs, 1976

Species of beetle

Zenochloris densepunctata is a species of beetle in the family Cerambycidae. It was described by Ernst Fuchs in 1976.
