= Zenochloris freyi =

Scientific classification
- Kingdom: Animalia
- Phylum: Arthropoda
- Class: Insecta
- Order: Coleoptera
- Suborder: Polyphaga
- Infraorder: Cucujiformia
- Family: Cerambycidae
- Genus: Zenochloris
- Species: Z. freyi

Binomial name
- Zenochloris freyi E. Fuchs, 1966

Species of beetle

Zenochloris freyi is a species of beetle in the family Cerambycidae. It was described by Ernst Fuchs in 1966.
