= Zenochloris paradoxa =

Scientific classification
- Kingdom: Animalia
- Phylum: Arthropoda
- Class: Insecta
- Order: Coleoptera
- Suborder: Polyphaga
- Infraorder: Cucujiformia
- Family: Cerambycidae
- Genus: Zenochloris
- Species: Z. paradoxa

Binomial name
- Zenochloris paradoxa Bates, 1885

Species of beetle

Zenochloris paradoxa is a species of beetle in the family Cerambycidae. It was described by Henry Walter Bates in 1885.
