= Zenochloris =

Scientific classification
- Kingdom: Animalia
- Phylum: Arthropoda
- Class: Insecta
- Order: Coleoptera
- Suborder: Polyphaga
- Infraorder: Cucujiformia
- Family: Cerambycidae
- Subfamily: Cerambycinae
- Tribe: Trachyderini
- Genus: Zenochloris; Bates, 1885

Genus of beetles

Zenochloris is a genus of beetles in the family Cerambycidae, containing the following species:

- Zenochloris barbicauda Bates, 1892
- Zenochloris densepunctata Fuchs, 1976
- Zenochloris freyi Fuchs, 1966
- Zenochloris major Chemsak & Hovore, in Eya, 2010
- Zenochloris paradoxa Bates, 1885
- Zenochloris vandykei Linsley, 1935
