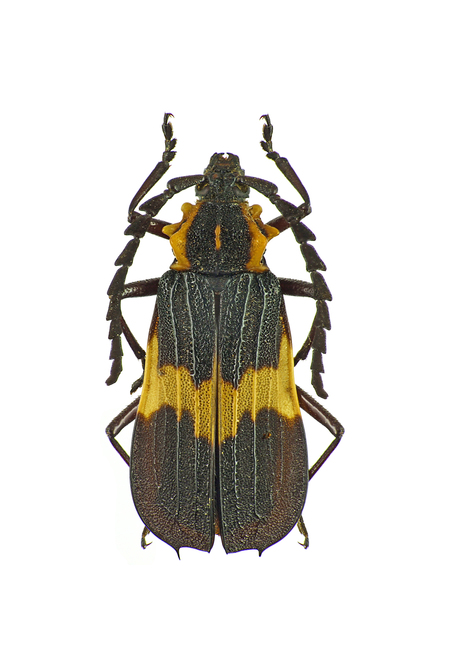

Scientific classification
- Kingdom: Animalia
- Phylum: Arthropoda
- Clade: Pancrustacea
- Class: Insecta
- Order: Coleoptera
- Suborder: Polyphaga
- Infraorder: Cucujiformia
- Family: Cerambycidae
- Genus: Pteracantha
- Species: P. fasciata

Binomial name
- Pteracantha fasciata Newman, 1838

= Pteracantha fasciata =

Species of beetle

Pteracantha fasciata is a species of beetle in the family Cerambycidae. It was described by Newman in 1838.
