= Pteracantha agrestis =

Scientific classification
- Domain: Eukaryota
- Kingdom: Animalia
- Phylum: Arthropoda
- Class: Insecta
- Order: Coleoptera
- Suborder: Polyphaga
- Infraorder: Cucujiformia
- Family: Cerambycidae
- Genus: Pteracantha
- Species: P. agrestis

Binomial name
- Pteracantha agrestis Monné & Monné, 2002

Species of beetle

Pteracantha agrestis is a species of beetle in the family Cerambycidae. It was described by Monné & Monné in 2002.
