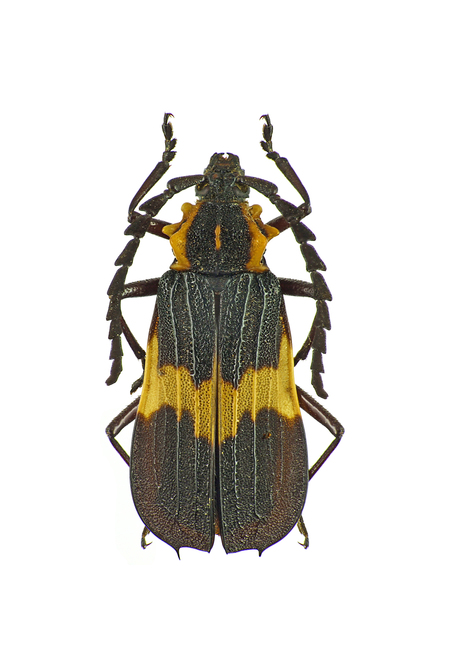
- Pteracantha fasciata

Scientific classification
- Kingdom: Animalia
- Phylum: Arthropoda
- Clade: Pancrustacea
- Class: Insecta
- Order: Coleoptera
- Suborder: Polyphaga
- Infraorder: Cucujiformia
- Family: Cerambycidae
- Subfamily: Cerambycinae
- Tribe: Trachyderini
- Genus: Pteracantha; Newmann, 1838

= Pteracantha =

Genus of beetles

Pteracantha is a genus of beetles in the family Cerambycidae, containing the following species:

- Pteracantha agrestis Monné & Monné, 2002
- Pteracantha fasciata Newman, 1838
