= Stenobatyle =

Scientific classification
- Kingdom: Animalia
- Phylum: Arthropoda
- Class: Insecta
- Order: Coleoptera
- Suborder: Polyphaga
- Infraorder: Cucujiformia
- Family: Cerambycidae
- Subfamily: Cerambycinae
- Tribe: Trachyderini
- Genus: Stenobatyle; Casey, 1912

Genus of beetles

Stenobatyle is a genus of beetles in the family Cerambycidae, containing the following species:

- Stenobatyle eburata (Chevrolat, 1862)
- Stenobatyle gracilis Chemsak, 1980
- Stenobatyle inflaticollis (Linsley, 1935)
- Stenobatyle miniatocollis (Chevrolat, 1862)
- Stenobatyle prolixa (Bates, 1892)
