= Stenobatyle inflaticollis =

Scientific classification
- Domain: Eukaryota
- Kingdom: Animalia
- Phylum: Arthropoda
- Class: Insecta
- Order: Coleoptera
- Suborder: Polyphaga
- Infraorder: Cucujiformia
- Family: Cerambycidae
- Genus: Stenobatyle
- Species: S. inflaticollis

Binomial name
- Stenobatyle inflaticollis (Linsley, 1935)

Species of beetle

Stenobatyle inflaticollis is a species of beetle in the family Cerambycidae. It was described by Linsley in 1935.
