= Stenobatyle miniatocollis =

Scientific classification
- Domain: Eukaryota
- Kingdom: Animalia
- Phylum: Arthropoda
- Class: Insecta
- Order: Coleoptera
- Suborder: Polyphaga
- Infraorder: Cucujiformia
- Family: Cerambycidae
- Genus: Stenobatyle
- Species: S. miniatocollis

Binomial name
- Stenobatyle miniatocollis (Chevrolat, 1862)

Species of beetle

Stenobatyle miniatocollis is a species of beetle in the family Cerambycidae. It was described by Chevrolat in 1862.
