= Stenobatyle gracilis =

Scientific classification
- Domain: Eukaryota
- Kingdom: Animalia
- Phylum: Arthropoda
- Class: Insecta
- Order: Coleoptera
- Suborder: Polyphaga
- Infraorder: Cucujiformia
- Family: Cerambycidae
- Genus: Stenobatyle
- Species: S. gracilis

Binomial name
- Stenobatyle gracilis Chemsak, 1980

Species of beetle

Stenobatyle gracilis is a species of beetle in the family Cerambycidae. It was described by Chemsak in 1980.
