= Stenobatyle prolixa =

Scientific classification
- Kingdom: Animalia
- Phylum: Arthropoda
- Clade: Pancrustacea
- Class: Insecta
- Order: Coleoptera
- Suborder: Polyphaga
- Infraorder: Cucujiformia
- Family: Cerambycidae
- Genus: Stenobatyle
- Species: S. prolixa

Binomial name
- Stenobatyle prolixa (Bates, 1892)

Synonyms
- Entomosterna prolixa Bates, 1892; Parabatyle prolixa Chemsak & Linsley 1974

Species of beetle

Stenobatyle prolixa is a species of beetle in the family Cerambycidae. It is native to Mexico and can be found from Guerrero to Oaxaca.
