= Assycuera =

Scientific classification
- Domain: Eukaryota
- Kingdom: Animalia
- Phylum: Arthropoda
- Class: Insecta
- Order: Coleoptera
- Suborder: Polyphaga
- Infraorder: Cucujiformia
- Family: Cerambycidae
- Subfamily: Cerambycinae
- Tribe: Trachyderini
- Genus: Assycuera; Napp & Monné, 2001

Genus of beetles

Assycuera is a genus of beetles in the family Cerambycidae, containing the following species:

- Assycuera macrotela (Bates, 1880)
- Assycuera marcelae Martins & Galileo, 2010
- Assycuera rubella (Bates, 1892)
- Assycuera scabricollis (Chemsak, 1963)
- Assycuera waterhousei (White, 1855)
