= Assycuera macrotela =

Scientific classification
- Domain: Eukaryota
- Kingdom: Animalia
- Phylum: Arthropoda
- Class: Insecta
- Order: Coleoptera
- Suborder: Polyphaga
- Infraorder: Cucujiformia
- Family: Cerambycidae
- Genus: Assycuera
- Species: A. macrotela

Binomial name
- Assycuera macrotela (Bates, 1880)

Species of beetle

Assycuera macrotela is a species of beetle in the family Cerambycidae. It was described by Henry Walter Bates in 1880.
