= Assycuera marcelae =

Scientific classification
- Domain: Eukaryota
- Kingdom: Animalia
- Phylum: Arthropoda
- Class: Insecta
- Order: Coleoptera
- Suborder: Polyphaga
- Infraorder: Cucujiformia
- Family: Cerambycidae
- Genus: Assycuera
- Species: A. marcelae

Binomial name
- Assycuera marcelae Martins & Galileo, 2010

Species of beetle

Assycuera marcelae is a species of beetle in the family Cerambycidae. It was described by Martins & Galileo in 2010.
