= Weyrauchia marcelae =

Scientific classification
- Kingdom: Animalia
- Phylum: Arthropoda
- Class: Insecta
- Order: Coleoptera
- Suborder: Polyphaga
- Infraorder: Cucujiformia
- Family: Cerambycidae
- Genus: Weyrauchia
- Species: W. marcelae

Binomial name
- Weyrauchia marcelae Martins & Galileo, 2008

Species of beetle

Weyrauchia marcelae is a species of beetle in the family Cerambycidae. It was described by Martins & Galileo in 2008.
