= Weyrauchia viridimicans =

Scientific classification
- Kingdom: Animalia
- Phylum: Arthropoda
- Class: Insecta
- Order: Coleoptera
- Suborder: Polyphaga
- Infraorder: Cucujiformia
- Family: Cerambycidae
- Genus: Weyrauchia
- Species: W. viridimicans

Binomial name
- Weyrauchia viridimicans Tippmann, 1953

Species of beetle

Weyrauchia viridimicans is a species of beetle in the family Cerambycidae. It was described by Tippmann in 1953.
