= Weyrauchia aeruginosa =

Scientific classification
- Kingdom: Animalia
- Phylum: Arthropoda
- Class: Insecta
- Order: Coleoptera
- Suborder: Polyphaga
- Infraorder: Cucujiformia
- Family: Cerambycidae
- Genus: Weyrauchia
- Species: W. aeruginosa

Binomial name
- Weyrauchia aeruginosa Monne, 2004

Species of beetle

Weyrauchia aeruginosa is a species of beetle in the family Cerambycidae. It was described by Monne in 2004.
