= Weyrauchia =

Scientific classification
- Kingdom: Animalia
- Phylum: Arthropoda
- Class: Insecta
- Order: Coleoptera
- Suborder: Polyphaga
- Infraorder: Cucujiformia
- Family: Cerambycidae
- Subfamily: Cerambycinae
- Tribe: Trachyderini
- Genus: Weyrauchia; Tippmann, 1953

Genus of beetles

Weyrauchia is a genus of beetles in the family Cerambycidae, containing the following species:

- Weyrauchia aeruginosa Monne, 2004
- Weyrauchia marcelae Martins & Galileo, 2008
- Weyrauchia marinezae Martins & Galileo, 2008
- Weyrauchia nobilis Tippmann, 1960
- Weyrauchia viridimicans Tippmann, 1953
