= Rhodoleptus femoratus =

Scientific classification
- Kingdom: Animalia
- Phylum: Arthropoda
- Class: Insecta
- Order: Coleoptera
- Suborder: Polyphaga
- Infraorder: Cucujiformia
- Family: Cerambycidae
- Genus: Rhodoleptus
- Species: R. femoratus

Binomial name
- Rhodoleptus femoratus (Schaeffer, 1909)

Species of beetle

Rhodoleptus femoratus is a species of beetle in the family Cerambycidae. It was described by Schaeffer in 1909.
