= Rhodoleptus nigripennis =

Scientific classification
- Kingdom: Animalia
- Phylum: Arthropoda
- Class: Insecta
- Order: Coleoptera
- Suborder: Polyphaga
- Infraorder: Cucujiformia
- Family: Cerambycidae
- Genus: Rhodoleptus
- Species: R. nigripennis

Binomial name
- Rhodoleptus nigripennis Giesbert, 1993

Species of beetle

Rhodoleptus nigripennis is a species of beetle in the family Cerambycidae. It was described by Giesbert in 1993.
