= Rhodoleptus umbrosus =

Scientific classification
- Kingdom: Animalia
- Phylum: Arthropoda
- Class: Insecta
- Order: Coleoptera
- Suborder: Polyphaga
- Infraorder: Cucujiformia
- Family: Cerambycidae
- Genus: Rhodoleptus
- Species: R. umbrosus

Binomial name
- Rhodoleptus umbrosus Chemsak & Linsley, 1982

Species of beetle

Rhodoleptus umbrosus is a species of beetle in the family Cerambycidae. It was described by Chemsak & Linsley in 1982.
