= Rhodoleptus comis =

Scientific classification
- Kingdom: Animalia
- Phylum: Arthropoda
- Class: Insecta
- Order: Coleoptera
- Suborder: Polyphaga
- Infraorder: Cucujiformia
- Family: Cerambycidae
- Genus: Rhodoleptus
- Species: R. comis

Binomial name
- Rhodoleptus comis (Bates, 1892)

Synonyms
- Metaleptus comis Bates, 1892

Species of beetle

Rhodoleptus comis is a species of longhorn beetle native to Honduras and Mexico. It was described by Henry Walter Bates in 1892.
