= Rhodoleptus =

Scientific classification
- Kingdom: Animalia
- Phylum: Arthropoda
- Class: Insecta
- Order: Coleoptera
- Suborder: Polyphaga
- Infraorder: Cucujiformia
- Family: Cerambycidae
- Subfamily: Cerambycinae
- Tribe: Trachyderini
- Genus: Rhodoleptus; Linsley, 1962

Genus of beetles

Rhodoleptus is a genus of beetles in the family Cerambycidae, containing the following species:

- Rhodoleptus comis (Bates, 1892)
- Rhodoleptus femoratus (Schaeffer, 1909)
- Rhodoleptus nigripennis Giesbert, 1993
- Rhodoleptus umbrosus Chemsak & Linsley, 1982
