= Trachelissa =

Scientific classification
- Domain: Eukaryota
- Kingdom: Animalia
- Phylum: Arthropoda
- Class: Insecta
- Order: Coleoptera
- Suborder: Polyphaga
- Infraorder: Cucujiformia
- Family: Cerambycidae
- Subfamily: Cerambycinae
- Tribe: Trachyderini
- Genus: Trachelissa; Aurivillius, 1912

Genus of beetles

Trachelissa is a genus of beetles in the family Cerambycidae, containing the following species:

- Trachelissa maculicollis (Audinet-Serville, 1834)
- Trachelissa pustulata (Audinet-Serville, 1834)
- Trachelissa rugosipennis (Gounelle, 1911)
