= Trachelissa maculicollis =

Scientific classification
- Kingdom: Animalia
- Phylum: Arthropoda
- Clade: Pancrustacea
- Class: Insecta
- Order: Coleoptera
- Suborder: Polyphaga
- Infraorder: Cucujiformia
- Family: Cerambycidae
- Genus: Trachelissa
- Species: T. maculicollis

Binomial name
- Trachelissa maculicollis (Audinet-Serville, 1834)

Species of beetle

Trachelissa maculicollis is a species of beetle in the family Cerambycidae. It was described by Audinet-Serville in 1834. It is found in Brazil (Goiás, Mato Grosso do Sul, Minas Gerais, Espírito Santo, Rio de Janeiro, São Paulo, Paraná, Santa Catarina, Rio Grande do Sul), Bolivia, Paraguay, Argentina (Córdoba, Misiones, Corrientes, Entre Ríos) and Uruguay.
