= Trachelissa rugosipennis =

Scientific classification
- Domain: Eukaryota
- Kingdom: Animalia
- Phylum: Arthropoda
- Class: Insecta
- Order: Coleoptera
- Suborder: Polyphaga
- Infraorder: Cucujiformia
- Family: Cerambycidae
- Genus: Trachelissa
- Species: T. rugosipennis

Binomial name
- Trachelissa rugosipennis (Gounelle, 1911)

Species of beetle

Trachelissa rugosipennis is a species of beetle in the family Cerambycidae. It was described by Gounelle in 1911.
