= Pseudodeltaspis punctipennis =

Scientific classification
- Domain: Eukaryota
- Kingdom: Animalia
- Phylum: Arthropoda
- Class: Insecta
- Order: Coleoptera
- Suborder: Polyphaga
- Infraorder: Cucujiformia
- Family: Cerambycidae
- Genus: Pseudodeltaspis
- Species: P. punctipennis

Binomial name
- Pseudodeltaspis punctipennis Chemsak & Hovore, 2010

Species of beetle

Pseudodeltaspis punctipennis is a species of beetle in the family Cerambycidae. It was described by Chemsak & Hovore in 2010.
