= Pseudodeltaspis carolinae =

Scientific classification
- Domain: Eukaryota
- Kingdom: Animalia
- Phylum: Arthropoda
- Class: Insecta
- Order: Coleoptera
- Suborder: Polyphaga
- Infraorder: Cucujiformia
- Family: Cerambycidae
- Genus: Pseudodeltaspis
- Species: P. carolinae

Binomial name
- Pseudodeltaspis carolinae Audureau, 2008

Species of beetle

Pseudodeltaspis carolinae is a species of beetle in the family Cerambycidae. It was described by Audureau in 2008.
