= Pseudodeltaspis =

Scientific classification
- Domain: Eukaryota
- Kingdom: Animalia
- Phylum: Arthropoda
- Class: Insecta
- Order: Coleoptera
- Suborder: Polyphaga
- Infraorder: Cucujiformia
- Family: Cerambycidae
- Subfamily: Cerambycinae
- Tribe: Trachyderini
- Genus: Pseudodeltaspis; Linsley, 1935

Genus of beetles

Pseudodeltaspis is a genus of beetles in the family Cerambycidae, containing the following species:

- Pseudodeltaspis carolinae Audureau, 2008
- Pseudodeltaspis cyanea Linsley, 1935
- Pseudodeltaspis punctipennis Chemsak & Hovore, in Eya, 2010
