= Lissonoschema solangeae =

Scientific classification
- Domain: Eukaryota
- Kingdom: Animalia
- Phylum: Arthropoda
- Class: Insecta
- Order: Coleoptera
- Suborder: Polyphaga
- Infraorder: Cucujiformia
- Family: Cerambycidae
- Genus: Lissonoschema
- Species: L. solangeae

Binomial name
- Lissonoschema solangeae Martins & Monné, 2000

Species of beetle

Lissonoschema solangeae is a species of beetle in the family Cerambycidae. It was described by Martins & Monné in 2000.
