= Lissonoschema =

Scientific classification
- Domain: Eukaryota
- Kingdom: Animalia
- Phylum: Arthropoda
- Class: Insecta
- Order: Coleoptera
- Suborder: Polyphaga
- Infraorder: Cucujiformia
- Family: Cerambycidae
- Subfamily: Cerambycinae
- Tribe: Trachyderini
- Genus: Lissonoschema; Martins & Monné, 1978

Genus of beetles

Lissonoschema is a genus of beetles in the family Cerambycidae, containing the following species:

- Lissonoschema fasciatum (Fisher, 1944)
- Lissonoschema macrocolum Martins & Monné, 1978
- Lissonoschema solangeae Monné & Monné, 2000
