= Lissonoschema fasciatum =

Scientific classification
- Domain: Eukaryota
- Kingdom: Animalia
- Phylum: Arthropoda
- Class: Insecta
- Order: Coleoptera
- Suborder: Polyphaga
- Infraorder: Cucujiformia
- Family: Cerambycidae
- Genus: Lissonoschema
- Species: L. fasciatum

Binomial name
- Lissonoschema fasciatum (Fisher, 1944)

Species of beetle

Lissonoschema fasciatum is a species of beetle in the family Cerambycidae. It was described by Fisher in 1944.
