= Lissonoschema macrocolum =

Scientific classification
- Domain: Eukaryota
- Kingdom: Animalia
- Phylum: Arthropoda
- Class: Insecta
- Order: Coleoptera
- Suborder: Polyphaga
- Infraorder: Cucujiformia
- Family: Cerambycidae
- Genus: Lissonoschema
- Species: L. macrocolum

Binomial name
- Lissonoschema macrocolum Martins & Monné, 1978

Species of beetle

Lissonoschema macrocolum is a species of beetle of the family Cerambycidae. It was described by Martins & Monné in 1978.
