= Triacetelus viridipennis =

Scientific classification
- Domain: Eukaryota
- Kingdom: Animalia
- Phylum: Arthropoda
- Class: Insecta
- Order: Coleoptera
- Suborder: Polyphaga
- Infraorder: Cucujiformia
- Family: Cerambycidae
- Genus: Triacetelus
- Species: T. viridipennis

Binomial name
- Triacetelus viridipennis Chemsak & Linsley, 1976

Species of beetle

Triacetelus viridipennis is a species of beetle in the family Cerambycidae. It was described by Chemsak & Linsley in 1976.
