= Triacetelus =

Scientific classification
- Domain: Eukaryota
- Kingdom: Animalia
- Phylum: Arthropoda
- Class: Insecta
- Order: Coleoptera
- Suborder: Polyphaga
- Infraorder: Cucujiformia
- Family: Cerambycidae
- Subfamily: Cerambycinae
- Tribe: Trachyderini
- Genus: Triacetelus; Bates, 1892

Genus of beetles

Triacetelus is a genus of beetles in the family Cerambycidae, containing the following species:

- Triacetelus emarginatus (Chevrolat, 1862)
- Triacetelus sericatus Bates, 1892
- Triacetelus viridipennis Chemsak & Linsley, 1976
