= Galissus cyanopterus =

Scientific classification
- Domain: Eukaryota
- Kingdom: Animalia
- Phylum: Arthropoda
- Class: Insecta
- Order: Coleoptera
- Suborder: Polyphaga
- Infraorder: Cucujiformia
- Family: Cerambycidae
- Genus: Galissus
- Species: G. cyanopterus

Binomial name
- Galissus cyanopterus Dupont, 1840

Species of beetle

Galissus cyanopterus is a species of beetle in the family Cerambycidae. It was described by Dupont in 1840.
