= Galissus =

Scientific classification
- Domain: Eukaryota
- Kingdom: Animalia
- Phylum: Arthropoda
- Class: Insecta
- Order: Coleoptera
- Suborder: Polyphaga
- Infraorder: Cucujiformia
- Family: Cerambycidae
- Subfamily: Cerambycinae
- Tribe: Trachyderini
- Genus: Galissus; Dupont, 1840

Genus of beetles

Galissus is a genus of beetles in the family Cerambycidae, containing the following species:

- Galissus azureus Monné & Martins, 1981
- Galissus cyanopterus Dupont, 1840
- Galissus rubriventris Martins & Galileo, 2010
