= Galissus azureus =

Scientific classification
- Kingdom: Animalia
- Phylum: Arthropoda
- Class: Insecta
- Order: Coleoptera
- Suborder: Polyphaga
- Infraorder: Cucujiformia
- Family: Cerambycidae
- Genus: Galissus
- Species: G. azureus

Binomial name
- Galissus azureus Monné & Martins, 1981

Species of beetle

Galissus azureus is a species of beetle belonging to the family Cerambycidae. It was described by Monné & Martins in 1981.
