= Lissonotypus brasiliensis =

Scientific classification
- Domain: Eukaryota
- Kingdom: Animalia
- Phylum: Arthropoda
- Class: Insecta
- Order: Coleoptera
- Suborder: Polyphaga
- Infraorder: Cucujiformia
- Family: Cerambycidae
- Genus: Lissonotypus
- Species: L. brasiliensis

Binomial name
- Lissonotypus brasiliensis (Buquet, 1860)

Species of beetle

Lissonotypus brasiliensis is a species of beetle in the family Cerambycidae. It was described by Buquet in 1860.
