= Lissonotypus =

Scientific classification
- Domain: Eukaryota
- Kingdom: Animalia
- Phylum: Arthropoda
- Class: Insecta
- Order: Coleoptera
- Suborder: Polyphaga
- Infraorder: Cucujiformia
- Family: Cerambycidae
- Subfamily: Cerambycinae
- Tribe: Trachyderini
- Genus: Lissonotypus; Thomson, 1864

Genus of beetles

Lissonotypus is a genus of beetles in the family Cerambycidae, containing the following species:

- Lissonotypus brasiliensis (Buquet, 1860)
- Lissonotypus tetraspilotus (White, 1853)
