= Lissonotypus tetraspilotus =

Scientific classification
- Domain: Eukaryota
- Kingdom: Animalia
- Phylum: Arthropoda
- Class: Insecta
- Order: Coleoptera
- Suborder: Polyphaga
- Infraorder: Cucujiformia
- Family: Cerambycidae
- Genus: Lissonotypus
- Species: L. tetraspilotus

Binomial name
- Lissonotypus tetraspilotus (White, 1853)

Species of beetle

Lissonotypus tetraspilotus is a species of beetle in the family Cerambycidae. It was described by White in 1853.
