= Neotaphos hamaticollis =

Scientific classification
- Kingdom: Animalia
- Phylum: Arthropoda
- Clade: Pancrustacea
- Class: Insecta
- Order: Coleoptera
- Suborder: Polyphaga
- Infraorder: Cucujiformia
- Family: Cerambycidae
- Genus: Neotaphos
- Species: N. hamaticollis

Binomial name
- Neotaphos hamaticollis (Guérin-Méneville, 1844)

Species of beetle

Neotaphos hamaticollis is a species of beetle in the family Cerambycidae. It was described by Félix Édouard Guérin-Méneville in 1844.
