= Neotaphos =

Scientific classification
- Domain: Eukaryota
- Kingdom: Animalia
- Phylum: Arthropoda
- Class: Insecta
- Order: Coleoptera
- Suborder: Polyphaga
- Infraorder: Cucujiformia
- Family: Cerambycidae
- Subfamily: Cerambycinae
- Tribe: Trachyderini
- Genus: Neotaphos; Fisher, 1936

Genus of beetles

Neotaphos is a genus of beetles in the family Cerambycidae, containing the following species:

- Neotaphos hamaticollis (Guérin-Méneville, 1844)
- Neotaphos rachelis Fisher, 1936
