= Paroxoplus =

Scientific classification
- Domain: Eukaryota
- Kingdom: Animalia
- Phylum: Arthropoda
- Class: Insecta
- Order: Coleoptera
- Suborder: Polyphaga
- Infraorder: Cucujiformia
- Family: Cerambycidae
- Subfamily: Cerambycinae
- Tribe: Trachyderini
- Genus: Paroxoplus; Chemsak, 1959

Genus of beetles

Paroxoplus is a genus of beetles in the family Cerambycidae, containing the following species:

- Paroxoplus ornaticollis (Lacordaire, 1869)
- Paroxoplus poecilus (Bates, 1880)
