= Paroxoplus ornaticollis =

Scientific classification
- Domain: Eukaryota
- Kingdom: Animalia
- Phylum: Arthropoda
- Class: Insecta
- Order: Coleoptera
- Suborder: Polyphaga
- Infraorder: Cucujiformia
- Family: Cerambycidae
- Genus: Paroxoplus
- Species: P. ornaticollis

Binomial name
- Paroxoplus ornaticollis (Lacordaire, 1869)

Species of beetle

Paroxoplus ornaticollis is a species of beetle in the family Cerambycidae. It was described by Lacordaire in 1869.
