= Tuberorachidion pumilio =

Scientific classification
- Domain: Eukaryota
- Kingdom: Animalia
- Phylum: Arthropoda
- Class: Insecta
- Order: Coleoptera
- Suborder: Polyphaga
- Infraorder: Cucujiformia
- Family: Cerambycidae
- Genus: Tuberorachidion
- Species: T. pumilio

Binomial name
- Tuberorachidion pumilio (Gounelle, 1911)

Species of beetle

Tuberorachidion pumilio is a species of beetle in the family Cerambycidae. It was described by Gounelle in 1911.
