= Tuberorachidion =

Scientific classification
- Domain: Eukaryota
- Kingdom: Animalia
- Phylum: Arthropoda
- Class: Insecta
- Order: Coleoptera
- Suborder: Polyphaga
- Infraorder: Cucujiformia
- Family: Cerambycidae
- Subfamily: Cerambycinae
- Tribe: Trachyderini
- Genus: Tuberorachidion; Tippmann, 1953

Genus of beetles

Tuberorachidion is a genus of beetles in the family Cerambycidae, containing the following species:

- Tuberorachidion lanei Tippmann, 1953
- Tuberorachidion pumilio (Gounelle, 1911)
