= Lissonomimus megaderinus =

Scientific classification
- Domain: Eukaryota
- Kingdom: Animalia
- Phylum: Arthropoda
- Class: Insecta
- Order: Coleoptera
- Suborder: Polyphaga
- Infraorder: Cucujiformia
- Family: Cerambycidae
- Genus: Lissonomimus
- Species: L. megaderinus

Binomial name
- Lissonomimus megaderinus (Lane, 1973)

Species of beetle

Lissonomimus megaderinus is a species of beetle in the family Cerambycidae. It was described by Lane in 1973.
