= Lissonomimus =

Scientific classification
- Kingdom: Animalia
- Phylum: Arthropoda
- Class: Insecta
- Order: Coleoptera
- Suborder: Polyphaga
- Infraorder: Cucujiformia
- Family: Cerambycidae
- Subfamily: Cerambycinae
- Tribe: Trachyderini
- Genus: Lissonomimus; Viana & Martinez, 1992

Genus of beetles

Lissonomimus is a genus of beetles in the family Cerambycidae, containing the following species:

- Lissonomimus auratopilosus Di Iorio, 1998
- Lissonomimus megaderinus (Lane, 1973)
