= Lissonomimus auratopilosus =

Scientific classification
- Domain: Eukaryota
- Kingdom: Animalia
- Phylum: Arthropoda
- Class: Insecta
- Order: Coleoptera
- Suborder: Polyphaga
- Infraorder: Cucujiformia
- Family: Cerambycidae
- Genus: Lissonomimus
- Species: L. auratopilosus

Binomial name
- Lissonomimus auratopilosus Di Iorio, 1998

Species of beetle

Lissonomimus auratopilosus is a species of beetle in the family Cerambycidae. It was described by Di Iorio in 1998.
