= Entomosterna ruficollis =

Scientific classification
- Kingdom: Animalia
- Phylum: Arthropoda
- Class: Insecta
- Order: Coleoptera
- Suborder: Polyphaga
- Infraorder: Cucujiformia
- Family: Cerambycidae
- Genus: Entomosterna
- Species: E. ruficollis

Binomial name
- Entomosterna ruficollis Chemsak & Hovore, 2010

Species of beetle

Entomosterna ruficollis is a species of beetle in the family Cerambycidae. It was described by Chemsak & Hovore in 2010.
