= Entomosterna =

Scientific classification
- Domain: Eukaryota
- Kingdom: Animalia
- Phylum: Arthropoda
- Class: Insecta
- Order: Coleoptera
- Suborder: Polyphaga
- Infraorder: Cucujiformia
- Family: Cerambycidae
- Subfamily: Cerambycinae
- Tribe: Trachyderini
- Genus: Entomosterna; Chevrolat, 1862

Genus of beetles

Entomosterna is a genus of beetles in the family Cerambycidae, containing the following species:

- Entomosterna cruentata Chevrolat, 1862
- Entomosterna ruficollis Chemsak & Hovore, in Eya, 2010
