= Entomosterna cruentata =

Scientific classification
- Domain: Eukaryota
- Kingdom: Animalia
- Phylum: Arthropoda
- Class: Insecta
- Order: Coleoptera
- Suborder: Polyphaga
- Infraorder: Cucujiformia
- Family: Cerambycidae
- Genus: Entomosterna
- Species: E. cruentata

Binomial name
- Entomosterna cruentata Chevrolat, 1862

Species of beetle

Entomosterna cruentata is a species of beetle in the family Cerambycidae. It was described by Chevrolat in 1862.
