= Noguerana =

Scientific classification
- Domain: Eukaryota
- Kingdom: Animalia
- Phylum: Arthropoda
- Class: Insecta
- Order: Coleoptera
- Suborder: Polyphaga
- Infraorder: Cucujiformia
- Family: Cerambycidae
- Subfamily: Cerambycinae
- Tribe: Trachyderini
- Genus: Noguerana; Chemsak & Linsley, 1988

Genus of beetles

Noguerana is a genus of beetles in the family Cerambycidae, containing the following species:

- Noguerana aliciae Chemsak & Linsley, 1988
- Noguerana rodriguezae Noguera, 2005
