= Noguerana rodriguezae =

Scientific classification
- Domain: Eukaryota
- Kingdom: Animalia
- Phylum: Arthropoda
- Class: Insecta
- Order: Coleoptera
- Suborder: Polyphaga
- Infraorder: Cucujiformia
- Family: Cerambycidae
- Genus: Noguerana
- Species: N. rodriguezae

Binomial name
- Noguerana rodriguezae Noguera, 2005

Species of beetle

Noguerana rodriguezae is a species of beetle in the family Cerambycidae. It was described by Noguera in 2005.
