= Noguerana aliciae =

Scientific classification
- Domain: Eukaryota
- Kingdom: Animalia
- Phylum: Arthropoda
- Class: Insecta
- Order: Coleoptera
- Suborder: Polyphaga
- Infraorder: Cucujiformia
- Family: Cerambycidae
- Genus: Noguerana
- Species: N. aliciae

Binomial name
- Noguerana aliciae Chemsak & Linsley, 1988

Species of beetle

Noguerana aliciae is a species of beetle in the family Cerambycidae. It was described by Chemsak & Linsley in 1988.
