= Chemsakia =

Scientific classification
- Kingdom: Animalia
- Phylum: Arthropoda
- Clade: Pancrustacea
- Class: Insecta
- Order: Coleoptera
- Suborder: Polyphaga
- Infraorder: Cucujiformia
- Family: Cerambycidae
- Subfamily: Cerambycinae
- Tribe: Trachyderini
- Genus: Chemsakia; Linsley, 1967

Genus of beetles

Chemsakia is a genus of beetles in the family Cerambycidae, containing the following species:

- Chemsakia semicostata (Bates, 1872);
- Chemsakia subarmata Linsley, 1967.
