= Chemsakia semicostata =

Scientific classification
- Domain: Eukaryota
- Kingdom: Animalia
- Phylum: Arthropoda
- Class: Insecta
- Order: Coleoptera
- Suborder: Polyphaga
- Infraorder: Cucujiformia
- Family: Cerambycidae
- Genus: Chemsakia
- Species: C. semicostata

Binomial name
- Chemsakia semicostata (Bates, 1872)

Species of beetle

Chemsakia semicostata is a species of beetle in the family Cerambycidae. It was described by Henry Walter Bates in 1872.
