= Chemsakia subarmata =

Scientific classification
- Domain: Eukaryota
- Kingdom: Animalia
- Phylum: Arthropoda
- Class: Insecta
- Order: Coleoptera
- Suborder: Polyphaga
- Infraorder: Cucujiformia
- Family: Cerambycidae
- Genus: Chemsakia
- Species: C. subarmata

Binomial name
- Chemsakia subarmata Linsley, 1967

Species of beetle

Chemsakia subarmata is a species of beetle in the family Cerambycidae. It was described by Linsley in 1967.
