= Seabraellus gracilis =

Scientific classification
- Kingdom: Animalia
- Phylum: Arthropoda
- Class: Insecta
- Order: Coleoptera
- Suborder: Polyphaga
- Infraorder: Cucujiformia
- Family: Cerambycidae
- Genus: Seabraellus
- Species: S. gracilis

Binomial name
- Seabraellus gracilis Huedepohl, 1985

Species of beetle

Seabraellus gracilis is a species of beetle in the family Cerambycidae. It was described by Huedepohl in 1985.
