= Seabraellus =

Scientific classification
- Kingdom: Animalia
- Phylum: Arthropoda
- Class: Insecta
- Order: Coleoptera
- Suborder: Polyphaga
- Infraorder: Cucujiformia
- Family: Cerambycidae
- Subfamily: Cerambycinae
- Tribe: Trachyderini
- Genus: Seabraellus; Hüdepohl, 1985

Genus of beetles

Seabraellus is a genus of beetles in the family Cerambycidae, containing the following species:

- Seabraellus gracilis Huedepohl, 1985
- Seabraellus splendidior Huedepohl, 1985
