= Pilostenaspis =

Scientific classification
- Domain: Eukaryota
- Kingdom: Animalia
- Phylum: Arthropoda
- Class: Insecta
- Order: Coleoptera
- Suborder: Polyphaga
- Infraorder: Cucujiformia
- Family: Cerambycidae
- Subfamily: Cerambycinae
- Tribe: Trachyderini
- Subtribe: Trachyderina
- Genus: Pilostenaspis; Eya

Genus of beetles

Pilostenaspis is a genus of long-horned beetles in the family Cerambycidae. There are at least three described species in Pilostenaspis.

== Species ==
These three species belong to the genus Pilostenaspis:

- Pilostenaspis copei Eya, 2015
- Pilostenaspis lateralis (LeConte, 1884)
- Pilostenaspis pilosella (Bates, 1892)
