= Pilostenaspis lateralis =

Scientific classification
- Kingdom: Animalia
- Phylum: Arthropoda
- Class: Insecta
- Order: Coleoptera
- Suborder: Polyphaga
- Infraorder: Cucujiformia
- Family: Cerambycidae
- Tribe: Trachyderini
- Subtribe: Trachyderina
- Genus: Pilostenaspis
- Species: P. lateralis

Binomial name
- Pilostenaspis lateralis (LeConte, 1884)

Species of beetle

Pilostenaspis lateralis is a species of long-horned beetle in the family Cerambycidae.
