= Hoplocnemis mutica =

Scientific classification
- Kingdom: Animalia
- Phylum: Arthropoda
- Class: Insecta
- Order: Coleoptera
- Suborder: Polyphaga
- Infraorder: Scarabaeiformia
- Family: Scarabaeidae
- Genus: Hoplocnemis
- Species: H. mutica

Binomial name
- Hoplocnemis mutica (Burmeister, 1844)

Synonyms
- Hoploscelis mutica Burmeister, 1844

Species of beetle

Hoplocnemis mutica is a species of beetle of the family Scarabaeidae. It is found in South Africa (Western Cape, Northern Cape, Eastern Cape, Free State).

== Description ==
Adults reach a length of about 12.5 mm (0.49 in). They are very similar to Hoplocnemis auriventris and more especially the red-winged specimens of Hoplocnemis armata, but it is only on the propygidium that there are a few scattered flavescent scales, while the abdomen has none. The colour is black, the elytra only being brick-red, the sculpture and vestiture, with the exception of the scales on the abdomen, are as in H. armata, but in the hind legs are different.
