= Gymnoloma pusilla =

Scientific classification
- Kingdom: Animalia
- Phylum: Arthropoda
- Class: Insecta
- Order: Coleoptera
- Suborder: Polyphaga
- Infraorder: Scarabaeiformia
- Family: Scarabaeidae
- Genus: Gymnoloma
- Species: G. pusilla

Binomial name
- Gymnoloma pusilla Péringuey, 1902

Species of beetle

Gymnoloma pusilla is a species of beetle of the family Scarabaeidae. It is found in South Africa (Cape).

== Description ==
Adults reach a length of about 3.5 mm (0.14 in). They are very similar to Gymnoloma parvula, but smaller. The shape and sculpture of the head and of the outer teeth of the anterior tibiae are similar, but the pronotum is not grooved longitudinally in the centre, and is uniformly covered with small, elongate, slightly flavescent scales. The elytra are also uniformly clothed with similar scales, and the pygidial part and the abdomen are scaly.
