= Megistoplia tenebrica =

Scientific classification
- Kingdom: Animalia
- Phylum: Arthropoda
- Class: Insecta
- Order: Coleoptera
- Suborder: Polyphaga
- Infraorder: Scarabaeiformia
- Family: Scarabaeidae
- Genus: Megistoplia
- Species: M. tenebrica

Binomial name
- Megistoplia tenebrica Lacroix, 1997

Species of beetle

Megistoplia tenebrica is a species of beetle of the family Scarabaeidae. It is found in Madagascar.

== Description ==
Adults reach a length of about 8–10 mm (0.31–0.39 in). The shape of their body is similar to, but less massive than that of Megistoplia impensa. The upper surface is dark brown (in males) and reddish brown (in females) with sparse hairs.
