= Idutywa vidua =

Scientific classification
- Kingdom: Animalia
- Phylum: Arthropoda
- Class: Insecta
- Order: Coleoptera
- Suborder: Polyphaga
- Infraorder: Scarabaeiformia
- Family: Scarabaeidae
- Genus: Idutywa
- Species: I. vidua

Binomial name
- Idutywa vidua (Blanchard, 1850)

Synonyms
- Monochelus viduus Blanchard, 1850

Species of beetle

Idutywa vidua is a species of beetle of the family Scarabaeidae. It is found in South Africa (Western Cape).

== Description ==
Adults reach a length of about 6 mm (0.24 in). The head and pronotum are shaped and sculptured as in Idutywa collaris, but covered with fuscous and brown hairs which on the pronotum form a dense, erect pubescence for two-thirds of the length, and are replaced in the posterior part with appressed hairs of the same colour. The scutellum is covered with appressed slightly greyish hairs. The elytra are similar in shape to those of I. collaris, but instead of having bands of greyish hairs on each side of the two intervals and also above the outer margin, the whole surface is covered with very fine concolorous hairs which, although very dense, do not hide the dark brown background. The pygidial part, abdomen and legs are also covered with similar hairs.
