= Euknemoplia lactinea =

Scientific classification
- Kingdom: Animalia
- Phylum: Arthropoda
- Class: Insecta
- Order: Coleoptera
- Suborder: Polyphaga
- Infraorder: Scarabaeiformia
- Family: Scarabaeidae
- Genus: Euknemoplia
- Species: E. lactinea

Binomial name
- Euknemoplia lactinea Lacroix, 1997

Species of beetle

Euknemoplia lactinea is a species of beetle of the family Scarabaeidae. It is found in Madagascar.

== Description ==
Adults reach a length of about 5–5.5 mm (0.20–0.22 in). Their body is less oval than in Euknemoplia semisulphurea. The upper surface has strong, regular, whitish scales.
