= Argoplia grata =

Scientific classification
- Kingdom: Animalia
- Phylum: Arthropoda
- Clade: Pancrustacea
- Class: Insecta
- Order: Coleoptera
- Suborder: Polyphaga
- Infraorder: Scarabaeiformia
- Family: Scarabaeidae
- Genus: Argoplia
- Species: A. grata

Binomial name
- Argoplia grata (Péringuey, 1902)

Synonyms
- Monochelus gratus Péringuey, 1902

Species of beetle

Argoplia grata is a species of beetle of the family Scarabaeidae. It is found in South Africa (Northern Cape, Western Cape).

== Description ==
Adults reach a length of about 6.5–7 mm (0.26–0.28 in). They are black, with the elytra red, very shining, and with the head and pronotum, the scutellum, the under side and legs clothed with very long, villose fulvous hairs. There are very few scales along the outer margins of the pronotum, and there is a small juxta-sutural patch of yellowish scales on each side of the elytra. In shape and sculpture it is similar to Argoplia glaberrimus.
