= Athesphatoplia curiosa =

Scientific classification
- Kingdom: Animalia
- Phylum: Arthropoda
- Class: Insecta
- Order: Coleoptera
- Suborder: Polyphaga
- Infraorder: Scarabaeiformia
- Family: Scarabaeidae
- Genus: Athesphatoplia
- Species: A. curiosa

Binomial name
- Athesphatoplia curiosa Lacroix, 1998

Species of beetle

Athesphatoplia curiosa is a species of beetle of the family Scarabaeidae. It is found in Madagascar.

== Description ==
Adults reach a length of about 6 mm (0.24 in). They are similar to Athesphatoplia mirifica, but the body is less elongated and the upper surface has white scales, mixed with brown scales, forming patterns.
