= Hoplocnemis andreaei =

Scientific classification
- Kingdom: Animalia
- Phylum: Arthropoda
- Class: Insecta
- Order: Coleoptera
- Suborder: Polyphaga
- Infraorder: Scarabaeiformia
- Family: Scarabaeidae
- Genus: Hoplocnemis
- Species: H. andreaei

Binomial name
- Hoplocnemis andreaei Schein, 1959

Species of beetle

Hoplocnemis andreaei is a species of beetle of the family Scarabaeidae. It is found in South Africa (Western Cape).

== Description ==
Adults reach a length of about 9–12 mm (0.35–0.47 in). They are reddish-brown with a black pronotum. They are very similar to Hoplocnemis crassipes.
