= Hoplocnemis koikoina =

Scientific classification
- Kingdom: Animalia
- Phylum: Arthropoda
- Class: Insecta
- Order: Coleoptera
- Suborder: Polyphaga
- Infraorder: Scarabaeiformia
- Family: Scarabaeidae
- Genus: Hoplocnemis
- Species: H. koikoina

Binomial name
- Hoplocnemis koikoina Péringuey, 1902

Species of beetle

Hoplocnemis koikoina is a species of beetle of the family Scarabaeidae. It is found in South Africa (Northern Cape, Western Cape).

== Description ==
Adults reach a length of about 13–15 mm (0.51–0.59 in). They are similar to Hoplocnemis spectabilis in shape and build, but the elytra are occasionally rufescent brown, the hairs clothing the pronotum are denser, there is no cephalic tubercle in either sex, the propygidium and the abdominal segments are not scaly, but fringed with long fulvous hairs, and the apical inner process of the hind tibiae, which is as long as in H. spectabilis, is bluntly serrate on each side.
