= Megistoplia =

Scientific classification
- Kingdom: Animalia
- Phylum: Arthropoda
- Class: Insecta
- Order: Coleoptera
- Suborder: Polyphaga
- Infraorder: Scarabaeiformia
- Family: Scarabaeidae
- Subfamily: Melolonthinae
- Tribe: Hopliini
- Genus: Megistoplia; Lacroix, 1997

Genus of leaf beetles

Megistoplia is a genus of beetles belonging to the family Scarabaeidae.

== Species ==
- Megistoplia griseohirta (Fairmaire, 1886)
- Megistoplia impensa Lacroix, 1997
- Megistoplia tenebrica Lacroix, 1997
