= Scelidothrix =

Scientific classification
- Kingdom: Animalia
- Phylum: Arthropoda
- Class: Insecta
- Order: Coleoptera
- Suborder: Polyphaga
- Infraorder: Scarabaeiformia
- Family: Scarabaeidae
- Subfamily: Melolonthinae
- Tribe: Hopliini
- Genus: Scelidothrix; Dombrow, 2001

Genus beetles

Scelidothrix is a genus of beetles belonging to the family Scarabaeidae.

== Species ==
- Scelidothrix nigropilosa (Dombrow, 2001)
- Scelidothrix veroniciana (Dombrow, 2001)
