= Gymnoloma spuria =

Scientific classification
- Kingdom: Animalia
- Phylum: Arthropoda
- Class: Insecta
- Order: Coleoptera
- Suborder: Polyphaga
- Infraorder: Scarabaeiformia
- Family: Scarabaeidae
- Genus: Gymnoloma
- Species: G. spuria

Binomial name
- Gymnoloma spuria Péringuey, 1902

Species of beetle

Gymnoloma spuria is a species of beetle of the family Scarabaeidae. It is found in South Africa (Western Cape).

== Description ==
Adults reach a length of about 6–7 mm (0.24–0.28 in). They are black, with the elytra chestnut-brown. The pronotum has faint traces of scattered whitish scales and the elytra have a juxta-sutural band of white elongate scales beginning at about the median part and reaching to the apex, and a discoidal one reaching from the base to about the median part. The propygidium and pygidium are covered with elongate, not very closely set white scales, and the abdominal segments are edged with elongate scales.
