= Gymnoloma atomaria =

Scientific classification
- Kingdom: Animalia
- Phylum: Arthropoda
- Clade: Pancrustacea
- Class: Insecta
- Order: Coleoptera
- Suborder: Polyphaga
- Infraorder: Scarabaeiformia
- Family: Scarabaeidae
- Genus: Gymnoloma
- Species: G. atomaria

Binomial name
- Gymnoloma atomaria (Fabricius, 1781)

Synonyms
- Melolontha atomaria Fabricius, 1781

Species of beetle

Gymnoloma atomaria is a species of beetle of the family Scarabaeidae. It is found in South Africa (Western Cape).

== Description ==
Adults reach a length of about 7–7.5 mm (0.28–0.30 in). Males are black, with the elytra light chocolate-brown, sprinkled with very numerous minute white scales and having on the outer margins of the pronotum three patches of denser white scales that are somewhat connected. The pygidium, sides of the abdomen, and pectus are very densely scaly, with the scales white. Females are similar to males, but with the scales distinctly flavescent or yellow.
