= Denticnema squamosa =

Scientific classification
- Kingdom: Animalia
- Phylum: Arthropoda
- Class: Insecta
- Order: Coleoptera
- Suborder: Polyphaga
- Infraorder: Scarabaeiformia
- Family: Scarabaeidae
- Genus: Denticnema
- Species: D. squamosa

Binomial name
- Denticnema squamosa (Burmeister, 1844)

Synonyms
- Pachycnema squamosa Burmeister, 1844; Denticnema squamosum

Species of beetle

Denticnema squamosa is a species of beetle of the family Scarabaeidae. It is found in South Africa (Western Cape, Northern Cape).

== Description ==
Adults reach a length of about 9–10 mm (0.35–0.39 in). The head and pronotum are black, the latter clothed with dense black hairs interspersed with white, lanceolate not very dense scales. The elytra are reddish brown, clothed with a dense but short black pubescence, and with somewhat closely set, and rather large ovate scales, white in males and flavescent in females.
