= Oberthuroplia pusilla =

Scientific classification
- Kingdom: Animalia
- Phylum: Arthropoda
- Class: Insecta
- Order: Coleoptera
- Suborder: Polyphaga
- Infraorder: Scarabaeiformia
- Family: Scarabaeidae
- Genus: Oberthuroplia
- Species: O. pusilla

Binomial name
- Oberthuroplia pusilla Lacroix, 1998

Species of beetle

Oberthuroplia pusilla is a species of beetle of the family Scarabaeidae. It is found in Madagascar.

== Description ==
Adults reach a length of about 6.5–7 mm (0.26–0.28 in). The upper surface is reddish-brown with narrow, sparsely spaced scaly bands and rather thinly covered with yellow, oval scales.
