= Burmeistoplia =

Scientific classification
- Kingdom: Animalia
- Phylum: Arthropoda
- Class: Insecta
- Order: Coleoptera
- Suborder: Polyphaga
- Infraorder: Scarabaeiformia
- Family: Scarabaeidae
- Subfamily: Melolonthinae
- Tribe: Hopliini
- Genus: Burmeistoplia; Dombrow, 2003
- Species: B. scutellaris

Binomial name
- Burmeistoplia scutellaris (Burmeister, 1844)

Synonyms
- Monochelus scutellaris Burmeister, 1844; Monochelus subvittatus Burmeister, 1844

Genus of beetles

Burmeistoplia is a genus of beetle of the family Scarabaeidae. It is monotypic, being represented by the single species, Burmeistoplia scutellaris, which is found in South Africa (Northern Cape, Western Cape).

== Description ==
Adults reach a length of about 8–10 mm (0.31–0.39 in). They are black and shining, clothed with appressed hairs, and the margins of the pronotum, scutellum, and abdomen are covered with white scales. The pronotum is very rugose, briefly but very densely pubescent, grooved longitudinally in the centre, narrowly marginate with greyish-white scales, and the median sulcus occasionally filled with similar scales. The scutellum is thickly scaly and the elytra are sub-scabroso-punctate. From each puncture springs a very short, sub-erect hair, and each one has two rounded, not very conspicuous costae which are more deeply but not as closely punctured as the intervals, or the sides. The propygidium, pygidium, abdomen, and pectus are clothed with flavescent, contiguous scales.
