= Phillsoppia steineri =

Scientific classification
- Kingdom: Animalia
- Phylum: Arthropoda
- Clade: Pancrustacea
- Class: Insecta
- Order: Coleoptera
- Suborder: Polyphaga
- Infraorder: Scarabaeiformia
- Family: Scarabaeidae
- Genus: Phillsoppia
- Species: P. steineri

Binomial name
- Phillsoppia steineri (Dombrow, 1997)

Synonyms
- Monochelus steineri Dombrow, 1997; Leptocnemis steineri

Species of beetle

Phillsoppia steineri is a species of beetle of the family Scarabaeidae. It is found in South Africa (Western Cape).
