= Dentatoplia =

Scientific classification
- Kingdom: Animalia
- Phylum: Arthropoda
- Clade: Pancrustacea
- Class: Insecta
- Order: Coleoptera
- Suborder: Polyphaga
- Infraorder: Scarabaeiformia
- Family: Scarabaeidae
- Subfamily: Melolonthinae
- Tribe: Hopliini
- Genus: Dentatoplia; Lacroix, 1997
- Species: D. rudesquamosa

Binomial name
- Dentatoplia rudesquamosa (Fairmaire, 1901)

Synonyms
- Hoplia rudesquamosa Fairmaire, 1901; Hoplia squameovaria Fairmaire, 1901

Genus of beetles

Dentatoplia is a genus of beetle of the family Scarabaeidae. It is monotypic, being represented by the single species, Dentatoplia rudesquamosa, which is found in Madagascar.

== Description ==
Adults reach a length of about 8–10 mm (0.31–0.39 in). The upper surface is dark brown with mixed white and yellow scales.
