= Hopliopsis convexa =

Scientific classification
- Kingdom: Animalia
- Phylum: Arthropoda
- Class: Insecta
- Order: Coleoptera
- Suborder: Polyphaga
- Infraorder: Scarabaeiformia
- Family: Scarabaeidae
- Genus: Hopliopsis
- Species: H. convexa

Binomial name
- Hopliopsis convexa Lacroix, 1998

Species of beetle

Hopliopsis convexa is a species of beetle of the family Scarabaeidae. It is found in Madagascar.

== Description ==
Adults reach a length of about 6–7 mm (0.24–0.28 in). They have an elongated, fairly straight body. The upper surface is reddish-brown with the elytra sometimes darker and fine, short, and abundant hairs.
