= Hoplocnemis lightfooti =

Scientific classification
- Kingdom: Animalia
- Phylum: Arthropoda
- Class: Insecta
- Order: Coleoptera
- Suborder: Polyphaga
- Infraorder: Scarabaeiformia
- Family: Scarabaeidae
- Genus: Hoplocnemis
- Species: H. lightfooti

Binomial name
- Hoplocnemis lightfooti Péringuey, 1908

Species of beetle

Hoplocnemis lightfooti is a species of beetle of the family Scarabaeidae. It is found in South Africa (Western Cape, Eastern Cape).

== Description ==
Adults reach a length of about 9 mm (0.35 in). They have a glossy surface. They are pitch-brown with reddish-brown legs. There is a small oval smooth area on the anterior area of the pronotum, while the rest of the pronotum is strongly punctate.
