= Bizanus vansoni =

Scientific classification
- Kingdom: Animalia
- Phylum: Arthropoda
- Class: Insecta
- Order: Coleoptera
- Suborder: Polyphaga
- Infraorder: Scarabaeiformia
- Family: Scarabaeidae
- Genus: Bizanus
- Species: B. vansoni

Binomial name
- Bizanus vansoni Schein, 1958

Species of beetle

Bizanus vansoni is a species of beetle of the family Scarabaeidae. It is found in South Africa (Western Cape).

== Description ==
Adults reach a length of about 4 mm (0.16 in). They are black with light brown elytra without distinct ribs, but with fine, dust-like greyish-white scales. There are yellow scalins on the pygidial area and dense white scales on the abdomen. The forelegs are red and the hind legs are black.
