= Hoplocnemis fuliginosa =

Scientific classification
- Kingdom: Animalia
- Phylum: Arthropoda
- Class: Insecta
- Order: Coleoptera
- Suborder: Polyphaga
- Infraorder: Scarabaeiformia
- Family: Scarabaeidae
- Genus: Hoplocnemis
- Species: H. fuliginosa

Binomial name
- Hoplocnemis fuliginosa (Burmeister, 1844)

Synonyms
- Hoploscelis fuliginosa Burmeister, 1844

Species of beetle

Hoplocnemis fuliginosa is a species of beetle of the family Scarabaeidae. It is found in South Africa (Western Cape, Northern Cape, Eastern Cape, Gauteng, Mpumalanga).

== Description ==
Adults reach a length of about 9–10 mm (0.35–0.39 in). The head and pronotum are fuscous black, while the elytra and legs are reddish brown. The abdomen and pygidium are covered with yellowish scales. The head is densely hairy, with black hairs. The pronotum is also densely hairy, and fringed with longer hairs laterally. The elytra are covered with small, elongate, flavescent scales not closely set, and have, in addition to the sutural and marginal rows of black setae, several series of equally long, black setae on each side.
