= Vansoniola =

Scientific classification
- Kingdom: Animalia
- Phylum: Arthropoda
- Class: Insecta
- Order: Coleoptera
- Suborder: Polyphaga
- Infraorder: Scarabaeiformia
- Family: Scarabaeidae
- Subfamily: Melolonthinae
- Tribe: Hopliini
- Genus: Vansoniola; Schein, 1958
- Species: V. kochi

Binomial name
- Vansoniola kochi (Schein, 1956)

Synonyms
- Scelophysa (Vansonia) Schein, 1956; Scelophysa (Vansonia) kochi Schein, 1956

Genus of beetles

Vansoniola is a genus of beetle of the family Scarabaeidae. It is monotypic, being represented by the single species, Vansoniola kochi, which is found in Namibia and South Africa (Northern Cape).

== Description ==
Adults reach a length of about 12–13 mm (0.47–0.51 in) (males) and 9.5–11.5 mm (0.37–0.45 in) (females). They are black and dull above but glossy below. The head, pronotum, scutellum, pygidium, underside and legs are without scales. The elytra have dull dark reddish-brown tomentum.
