= Knysna humeralis =

Scientific classification
- Kingdom: Animalia
- Phylum: Arthropoda
- Class: Insecta
- Order: Coleoptera
- Suborder: Polyphaga
- Infraorder: Scarabaeiformia
- Family: Scarabaeidae
- Genus: Knysna
- Species: K. humeralis

Binomial name
- Knysna humeralis (Burmeister, 1844)

Synonyms
- Ischnochelus humeralis Burmeister, 1844

Species of beetle

Knysna humeralis is a species of beetle of the family Scarabaeidae. It is found in South Africa (Western Cape).

== Description ==
Adults reach a length of about 7 mm (0.28 in). They are black, with the legs reddish and the antennae of the same colour as the legs, but with the club infuscate. The pronotum has a median longitudinal band of whitish scales and a supra-lateral one not very well defined. The elytra have a broad band of similar but a little more flavescent scales at a short distance from the suture. The pygidial part, abdomen and pectus are scaly.
