= Korisaba =

Scientific classification
- Kingdom: Animalia
- Phylum: Arthropoda
- Clade: Pancrustacea
- Class: Insecta
- Order: Coleoptera
- Suborder: Polyphaga
- Infraorder: Scarabaeiformia
- Family: Scarabaeidae
- Subfamily: Melolonthinae
- Tribe: Hopliini
- Genus: Korisaba; Péringuey, 1902
- Species: K. amabilis

Binomial name
- Korisaba amabilis Péringuey, 1902

Genus of beetles

Korisaba is a genus of beetle of the family Scarabaeidae. It is monotypic, being represented by the single species, Korisaba amabilis, which is found in South Africa (Cape).

== Description ==
Adults reach a length of about 5.25 mm (0.207 in). They are black, densely clothed with long, greyish and black hairs on the upper, and with greyish-white ones on the under sides. The scutellum is clothed with white hairs.
