= Blanchardoplia fulva =

Scientific classification
- Kingdom: Animalia
- Phylum: Arthropoda
- Class: Insecta
- Order: Coleoptera
- Suborder: Polyphaga
- Infraorder: Scarabaeiformia
- Family: Scarabaeidae
- Genus: Blanchardoplia
- Species: B. fulva

Binomial name
- Blanchardoplia fulva (Blanchard, 1850)

Synonyms
- Hoplia fulva Blanchard, 1850

Species of beetle

Blanchardoplia fulva is a species of beetle of the family Scarabaeidae. It is found in Madagascar.

== Description ==
Adults reach a length of about 4–5 mm (0.16–0.20 in). The upper surface is reddish-brown with sparse, scaly hairs arranged in groups, leaving the integument largely exposed.
