= Dolichiomicroscelis gracilis =

Scientific classification
- Kingdom: Animalia
- Phylum: Arthropoda
- Class: Insecta
- Order: Coleoptera
- Suborder: Polyphaga
- Infraorder: Scarabaeiformia
- Family: Scarabaeidae
- Genus: Dolichiomicroscelis
- Species: D. gracilis

Binomial name
- Dolichiomicroscelis gracilis (Péringuey, 1902)

Synonyms
- Monochelus gracilis Péringuey, 1902; Monochelus praestans Péringuey, 1908

Species of beetle

Dolichiomicroscelis gracilis is a species of beetle of the family Scarabaeidae. It is found in South Africa (Western Cape).

== Description ==
Adults reach a length of about 5 mm (0.20 in). They are black, with the legs rufescent, and the whole body, including the hind legs, clothed with closely set scales. The pronotum is setulose laterally and in front, but the setae are not long. It is completely covered above and laterally with greyish-white scales, and has a longitudinal band of light buff scales on each side of the median groove, and another above the outer margin. The scutellum is covered with white, slightly elongate scales. The elytra are covered with contiguous round white scales changing to light buff on the two costae. The scales on the pygidial part, abdomen, and pectus are pure white and very dense.
