= Phillsoppia =

Scientific classification
- Kingdom: Animalia
- Phylum: Arthropoda
- Class: Insecta
- Order: Coleoptera
- Suborder: Polyphaga
- Infraorder: Scarabaeiformia
- Family: Scarabaeidae
- Subfamily: Melolonthinae
- Tribe: Hopliini
- Genus: Phillsoppia; Allsopp & Schoolmeesters, 2024

Synonyms
- Leptocnemis Dombrow, 2001

Genus of beetles

Phillsoppia is a genus of beetles belonging to the family Scarabaeidae.

== Species ==
- Phillsoppia brunneosquamosa (Dombrow, 2001)
- Phillsoppia elkiana (Dombrow, 2001)
- Phillsoppia krakadoubergensis (Dombrow, 2001)
- Phillsoppia luteosuturalis (Dombrow, 2001)
- Phillsoppia rufipes (Dombrow, 2001)
- Phillsoppia steineri (Dombrow, 1997)
- Phillsoppia strigosa (Burmeister, 1844)
