= Macroplia =

Scientific classification
- Kingdom: Animalia
- Phylum: Arthropoda
- Class: Insecta
- Order: Coleoptera
- Suborder: Polyphaga
- Infraorder: Scarabaeiformia
- Family: Scarabaeidae
- Subfamily: Melolonthinae
- Tribe: Hopliini
- Genus: Macroplia; Brenske, 1898

Synonyms
- Araeohoplia Arrow, 1906

Genus beetles

Macroplia is a genus of beetles belonging to the family Scarabaeidae.

== Species ==
- Macroplia dekindti (Nonfried, 1895)
- Macroplia ruandana Brenske, 1898
- Macroplia signatipennis Moser, 1918
- Macroplia upembana Schein, 1959
