= Perabula marqueza =

Scientific classification
- Kingdom: Animalia
- Phylum: Arthropoda
- Class: Insecta
- Order: Coleoptera
- Suborder: Polyphaga
- Infraorder: Scarabaeiformia
- Family: Scarabaeidae
- Genus: Perabula
- Species: P. marqueza

Binomial name
- Perabula marqueza (Péringuey, 1902)

Synonyms
- Rabula marqueza Péringuey, 1902

Species of beetle

Perabula marqueza is a species of beetle of the family Scarabaeidae. It is found in Mozambique.

== Description ==
Adults reach a length of about 8 mm (0.31 in). They are dark chestnut-brown. The head is finely punctured and the pronotum is very finely punctulate, without any traces of larger punctures, and having some appressed squamulose hairs short and not set close to each other. The scutellum has a few squamose hairs. The elytra are plainly tri-costate on each side, the suture is a little raised, the two intermediate spaces between the suture and the second costa are also slightly raised in the centre, they are very coriaceous, and moderately densely clothed with small, not closely set squamulose greyish scales.
