= Hovachelus squamosulus =

Scientific classification
- Kingdom: Animalia
- Phylum: Arthropoda
- Class: Insecta
- Order: Coleoptera
- Suborder: Polyphaga
- Infraorder: Scarabaeiformia
- Family: Scarabaeidae
- Genus: Hovachelus
- Species: H. squamosulus

Binomial name
- Hovachelus squamosulus Fairmaire, 1900

Species of beetle

Hovachelus squamosulus is a species of beetle of the family Scarabaeidae. It is found in Madagascar.

== Description ==
Adults reach a length of about 8 mm (0.31 in).

== Taxonomy ==
In his study of Hopliini from Madagascar, Lacroix studied the only known specimen of this species and concluded it does not belong in the genus Hovachelus. However, due to the poor state of preservation of the specimen, placement within one of the Malagasy genera defined in his study proved impossible.
