= Hopleidos echinatus =

Scientific classification
- Kingdom: Animalia
- Phylum: Arthropoda
- Class: Insecta
- Order: Coleoptera
- Suborder: Polyphaga
- Infraorder: Scarabaeiformia
- Family: Scarabaeidae
- Genus: Hopleidos
- Species: H. echinatus

Binomial name
- Hopleidos echinatus Lacroix, 1998

Species of beetle

Hopleidos echinatus is a species of beetle of the family Scarabaeidae. It is found in Madagascar.

== Description ==
Adults reach a length of about 10–11 mm (0.39–0.43 in). They have an elongated body. The upper surface is reddish-brown with broad bands of yellow scales.
