= Stigmatoplia =

Scientific classification
- Kingdom: Animalia
- Phylum: Arthropoda
- Class: Insecta
- Order: Coleoptera
- Suborder: Polyphaga
- Infraorder: Scarabaeiformia
- Family: Scarabaeidae
- Subfamily: Melolonthinae
- Tribe: Hopliini
- Genus: Stigmatoplia; Dombrow, 2001

Genus beetles

Stigmatoplia is a genus of beetles belonging to the family Scarabaeidae.

== Species ==
- Stigmatoplia nikolaji Dombrow, 2001
- Stigmatoplia ornata (Burmeister, 1844)
