= Hopliopsis =

Scientific classification
- Kingdom: Animalia
- Phylum: Arthropoda
- Class: Insecta
- Order: Coleoptera
- Suborder: Polyphaga
- Infraorder: Scarabaeiformia
- Family: Scarabaeidae
- Subfamily: Melolonthinae
- Tribe: Hopliini
- Genus: Hopliopsis; Blanchard, 1850

Genus beetles

Hopliopsis is a genus of beetles belonging to the family Scarabaeidae.

== Species ==
- Hopliopsis badia Lacroix, 1998
- Hopliopsis convexa Lacroix, 1998
- Hopliopsis fulvovestita Blanchard, 1850
- Hopliopsis mocquerysi Lacroix, 1998
- Hopliopsis rufilata Lacroix, 1998
- Hopliopsis rufula Lacroix, 1998
- Hopliopsis vittulata (Fairmaire, 1901)
