= Pseudheterochelus =

Scientific classification
- Kingdom: Animalia
- Phylum: Arthropoda
- Class: Insecta
- Order: Coleoptera
- Suborder: Polyphaga
- Infraorder: Scarabaeiformia
- Family: Scarabaeidae
- Subfamily: Melolonthinae
- Tribe: Hopliini
- Genus: Pseudheterochelus; Schein, 1959
- Species: P. wallekraalensis

Binomial name
- Pseudheterochelus wallekraalensis Schein, 1959

Genus of beetles

Pseudheterochelus is a genus of beetle of the family Scarabaeidae. It is monotypic, being represented by the single species, Pseudheterochelus wallekraalensis, which is found in South Africa (Northern Cape).

== Description ==
Adults reach a length of about 6 mm (0.24 in). They are black, with the elytra light brown with darkened margins and sometimes also with a very narrow darkened suture, as well as with yellow spots. The pygidial part is densely covered with whitish-yellow scales.
