= Hopliopsis rufula =

Scientific classification
- Kingdom: Animalia
- Phylum: Arthropoda
- Class: Insecta
- Order: Coleoptera
- Suborder: Polyphaga
- Infraorder: Scarabaeiformia
- Family: Scarabaeidae
- Genus: Hopliopsis
- Species: H. rufula

Binomial name
- Hopliopsis rufula Lacroix, 1998

Species of beetle

Hopliopsis rufula is a species of beetle of the family Scarabaeidae. It is found in Madagascar.

== Description ==
Adults reach a length of about 6–6.5 mm (0.24–0.26 in). They have an elongated, rather narrow body. The upper surface is reddish-brown with abundant, elongated hairs.
