= Blanchardoplia pusilla =

Scientific classification
- Kingdom: Animalia
- Phylum: Arthropoda
- Class: Insecta
- Order: Coleoptera
- Suborder: Polyphaga
- Infraorder: Scarabaeiformia
- Family: Scarabaeidae
- Genus: Blanchardoplia
- Species: B. pusilla

Binomial name
- Blanchardoplia pusilla Lacroix, 1998

Species of beetle

Blanchardoplia pusilla is a species of beetle of the family Scarabaeidae. It is found in Madagascar.

== Description ==
Adults reach a length of about 4 mm (0.16 in). The upper surface is reddish-brown with very fine, sparse hairs.
