= Hoplocnemis armata =

Scientific classification
- Kingdom: Animalia
- Phylum: Arthropoda
- Class: Insecta
- Order: Coleoptera
- Suborder: Polyphaga
- Infraorder: Scarabaeiformia
- Family: Scarabaeidae
- Genus: Hoplocnemis
- Species: H. armata

Binomial name
- Hoplocnemis armata (Burmeister, 1844)

Synonyms
- Hoploscelis armata Burmeister, 1844

Species of beetle

Hoplocnemis armata is a species of beetle of the family Scarabaeidae. It is found in South Africa (Western Cape).

== Description ==
Adults reach a length of about 10.5–12 mm (0.41–0.47 in). They are very similar to Hoplocnemis auriventris, but some specimens have testaceous red elytra. The propygidium and abdomen are clothed also with flavous scales, but the hind legs, which are reddish brown, differ.
