= Thoracoplia =

Scientific classification
- Kingdom: Animalia
- Phylum: Arthropoda
- Class: Insecta
- Order: Coleoptera
- Suborder: Polyphaga
- Infraorder: Scarabaeiformia
- Family: Scarabaeidae
- Subfamily: Melolonthinae
- Tribe: Hopliini
- Genus: Thoracoplia; Prokofiev, 2015

Genus beetles

Thoracoplia is a genus of beetles belonging to the family Scarabaeidae.

== Species ==
- Thoracoplia abdominalis Kobayashi, 2021
- Thoracoplia kuatunensis (Tesař, 1963)
- Thoracoplia laosana Kobayashi, 2018
- Thoracoplia pictipes (Fairmaire, 1889)
- Thoracoplia sichuanensis Kobayashi, 2018
- Thoracoplia trichofemorata Kobayashi, 2018
- Thoracoplia xuorum Kobayashi, 2018
