= Gymnoloma tibialis =

Scientific classification
- Kingdom: Animalia
- Phylum: Arthropoda
- Class: Insecta
- Order: Coleoptera
- Suborder: Polyphaga
- Infraorder: Scarabaeiformia
- Family: Scarabaeidae
- Genus: Gymnoloma
- Species: G. tibialis

Binomial name
- Gymnoloma tibialis Péringuey, 1902

Species of beetle

Gymnoloma tibialis is a species of beetle of the family Scarabaeidae. It is found in South Africa (Eastern Cape).

== Description ==
Adults reach a length of about 7 mm (0.28 in). They are black, with the pronotum somewhat metallic, and the elytra testaceous, not scaly on the upper side, with the exception of a few scales on the sides of the pronotum and of the scutellum, but clothed with dense scales and whitish hairs underneath. The clypeus and the head are covered with long hairs and the pronotum is very densely hairy, with erect hairs. The pronotum is closely and somewhat roughly punctured, deeply grooved longitudinally in the centre. The elytra have on each side two conspicuous longitudinal impressions separated by two costae, they are deeply punctured, the punctures are somewhat scattered in the anterior part, but denser and distinctly granulose behind, from these punctures spring very short, blackish setae.
