= Ectinohoplia excisicollis =

Scientific classification
- Kingdom: Animalia
- Phylum: Arthropoda
- Class: Insecta
- Order: Coleoptera
- Suborder: Polyphaga
- Infraorder: Scarabaeiformia
- Family: Scarabaeidae
- Genus: Ectinohoplia
- Species: E. excisicollis

Binomial name
- Ectinohoplia excisicollis Frey, 1966

Species of beetle

Ectinohoplia excisicollis is a species of beetle of the family Scarabaeidae. It is found in Myanmar.

== Description ==
Adults reach a length of about 6 mm for males and 7 mm for females. They are black, with the upper and lower surfaces densely covered with rounded, silvery-grey scales, so that the ground color is only visible in a narrow stripe at the propygidium. Females have unicolored elytra, while males have an indistinct, double, jagged transverse band on the elytra, consisting of greenish scales. The legs, antennae, and in females also the clypeus, are light brown.
