= Megistoplia griseohirta =

Scientific classification
- Kingdom: Animalia
- Phylum: Arthropoda
- Class: Insecta
- Order: Coleoptera
- Suborder: Polyphaga
- Infraorder: Scarabaeiformia
- Family: Scarabaeidae
- Genus: Megistoplia
- Species: M. griseohirta

Binomial name
- Megistoplia griseohirta (Fairmaire, 1886)

Synonyms
- Hoplia griseohirta Fairmaire, 1886

Species of beetle

Megistoplia griseohirta is a species of beetle of the family Scarabaeidae. It is found in Madagascar.

== Description ==
Adults reach a length of about 9 mm (0.35 in). They have an elongated body. The upper surface is blackish-brown with fairly abundant hairs.
