= Euknemoplia =

Scientific classification
- Kingdom: Animalia
- Phylum: Arthropoda
- Class: Insecta
- Order: Coleoptera
- Suborder: Polyphaga
- Infraorder: Scarabaeiformia
- Family: Scarabaeidae
- Subfamily: Melolonthinae
- Tribe: Hopliini
- Genus: Euknemoplia; Lacroix, 1997

Genus of leaf beetles

Euknemoplia is a genus of beetles belonging to the family Scarabaeidae.

== Species ==
- Euknemoplia lacroixi Montreuil, 2012
- Euknemoplia lactinea Lacroix, 1997
- Euknemoplia semisulphurea (Fairmaire, 1900)
- Euknemoplia virgulata Lacroix, 1997
