= Sceloclania =

Scientific classification
- Kingdom: Animalia
- Phylum: Arthropoda
- Class: Insecta
- Order: Coleoptera
- Suborder: Polyphaga
- Infraorder: Scarabaeiformia
- Family: Scarabaeidae
- Subfamily: Melolonthinae
- Tribe: Hopliini
- Genus: Sceloclania; Schein, 1958

Synonyms
- Clania Schein, 1956

Genus beetles

Sceloclania is a genus of beetles belonging to the family Scarabaeidae.

== Species ==
- Sceloclania coeruleovittata (Schein, 1956)
- Sceloclania glenlyonensis (Dombrow, 1997)
- Sceloclania macgregori (Dombrow, 1997)
- Sceloclania namaqua (Dombrow, 1999)
- Sceloclania steineri (Dombrow, 1999)
- Sceloclania virescens (Péringuey, 1888)
