= Ceratochelus cathedralpeakensis =

Scientific classification
- Kingdom: Animalia
- Phylum: Arthropoda
- Clade: Pancrustacea
- Class: Insecta
- Order: Coleoptera
- Suborder: Polyphaga
- Infraorder: Scarabaeiformia
- Family: Scarabaeidae
- Genus: Ceratochelus
- Species: C. cathedralpeakensis

Binomial name
- Ceratochelus cathedralpeakensis Dombrow, 2002

Species of beetle

Ceratochelus cathedralpeakensis is a species of beetle of the family Scarabaeidae. It is found in South Africa (KwaZulu-Natal).
