= Eremoplia =

Scientific classification
- Kingdom: Animalia
- Phylum: Arthropoda
- Clade: Pancrustacea
- Class: Insecta
- Order: Coleoptera
- Suborder: Polyphaga
- Infraorder: Scarabaeiformia
- Family: Scarabaeidae
- Subfamily: Melolonthinae
- Tribe: Hopliini
- Genus: Eremoplia; Kolbe, 1914
- Species: E. inaequalis

Binomial name
- Eremoplia inaequalis Kolbe, 1914

Genus of beetles

Eremoplia is a genus of beetle of the family Scarabaeidae. It is monotypic, being represented by the single species, Eremoplia inaequalis, which is found in Rwanda and Burundi.

== Description ==
Adults reach a length of about 7–9 mm (0.28–0.35 in) for males and 10 mm (0.39 in) for females. They are pitch-brown to blackish and somewhat glossy. Males are fairly densely covered with greyish-yellow scales, while females are greyish-yellow and moderately densely and shortly haired. The frons is coarsely punctate and covered with long, narrow yellow scales. The pronotum is strongly narrowed anteriorly, somewhat posteriorly, broadly rounded around the middle of the sides, sides weakly indented before the anterior margin, straight before the posterior angles. The anterior angles are pointed. The dorsal surface of the pronotum is coarsely wrinkled-punctate and, in males, covered with short or oval, broad scales. In females, it is not densely covered with fine, yellow hairs. The lateral margins are fringed with individual long setae in both sexes. The elytra are narrowed behind the middle, like the pronotum. In males, they are densely covered with short oval scales, while in females, they are sparsely covered with fine, short hairs and with 5 to 6 rows of longer setae, which are denser at the sides. The thorax of the male is covered with oblong oval scales, while the female's is not densely covered with fine yellow hairs. The abdominal scales in the male are shorter and denser than those on the thorax. In females, the yellow hairs on the abdomen are also somewhat denser than those on the thorax.
