= Ceratochelus unyikabogomontanus =

Scientific classification
- Kingdom: Animalia
- Phylum: Arthropoda
- Clade: Pancrustacea
- Class: Insecta
- Order: Coleoptera
- Suborder: Polyphaga
- Infraorder: Scarabaeiformia
- Family: Scarabaeidae
- Genus: Ceratochelus
- Species: C. unyikabogomontanus

Binomial name
- Ceratochelus unyikabogomontanus Dombrow, 2002

Species of beetle

Ceratochelus unyikabogomontanus is a species of beetle of the family Scarabaeidae. It is found in Tanzania.
