= Dolichoplia longula =

Scientific classification
- Kingdom: Animalia
- Phylum: Arthropoda
- Class: Insecta
- Order: Coleoptera
- Suborder: Polyphaga
- Infraorder: Scarabaeiformia
- Family: Scarabaeidae
- Genus: Dolichoplia
- Species: D. longula

Binomial name
- Dolichoplia longula Lacroix, 1998

Species of beetle

Dolichoplia longula is a species of beetle of the family Scarabaeidae. It is found in Madagascar.

== Description ==
Adults reach a length of about 8–9 mm (0.31–0.35 in). They have a fairly robust body. The upper surface is dark brown with elongated, whitish scales.
