= Athesphatoplia =

Scientific classification
- Kingdom: Animalia
- Phylum: Arthropoda
- Class: Insecta
- Order: Coleoptera
- Suborder: Polyphaga
- Infraorder: Scarabaeiformia
- Family: Scarabaeidae
- Subfamily: Melolonthinae
- Tribe: Hopliini
- Genus: Athesphatoplia; Lacroix, 1998

Genus beetles

Athesphatoplia is a genus of beetles belonging to the family Scarabaeidae.

== Species ==
- Athesphatoplia curiosa Lacroix, 1998
- Athesphatoplia mirifica Lacroix, 1998
