= Microplus nemoralis =

Scientific classification
- Kingdom: Animalia
- Phylum: Arthropoda
- Class: Insecta
- Order: Coleoptera
- Suborder: Polyphaga
- Infraorder: Scarabaeiformia
- Family: Scarabaeidae
- Subfamily: Melolonthinae
- Tribe: Hopliini
- Genus: Microplus; Burmeister, 1844
- Species: M. nemoralis

Binomial name
- Microplus nemoralis Burmeister, 1844

Genus of beetles

Microplus is a genus of beetle of the family Scarabaeidae. It is monotypic, being represented by the single species, Microplus nemoralis, which is found in South Africa (Cape).

== Description ==
Adults reach a length of about 7.5–8 mm (0.30–0.31 in). They are rusty red and moderately shining. The head is clothed with short squamose flavescent hairs looking like scales, a few of these are to be seen along the marginal edges of the pronotum, on the scutellum and along the apical margin of the elytra. The pronotum is very closely punctured, each puncture bearing a slightly flavescent and very short appressed hair, and there are also a few erect setae on the disk, and a fringe of them along the anterior and lateral margins. The elytra are not plainly costulate, but are somewhat striate in the discoidal part, moderately deeply but somewhat closely and irregularly punctate, and have on each side eight series of short, white setae regularly disposed and not closely set, between these rows are some scattered, small, flavescent hair-like scales which are a little less remote on the posterior part. The pygidium, abdomen, and pectus are clothed with appressed flavescent hairs, and the legs are more bristly than pubescent.
