= Grammodoplia =

Scientific classification
- Kingdom: Animalia
- Phylum: Arthropoda
- Class: Insecta
- Order: Coleoptera
- Suborder: Polyphaga
- Infraorder: Scarabaeiformia
- Family: Scarabaeidae
- Subfamily: Melolonthinae
- Tribe: Hopliini
- Genus: Grammodoplia; Lacroix, 1997
- Species: G. asperata

Binomial name
- Grammodoplia asperata (Fairmaire, 1903)

Synonyms
- Hoplia asperata Fairmaire, 1903

Genus of beetles

Grammodoplia is a genus of beetle of the family Scarabaeidae. It is monotypic, being represented by the single species, Grammodoplia asperata, which is found in Madagascar.

== Description ==
Adults reach a length of about 4–6 mm (0.16–0.24 in). The head and pronotum are blackish, while the elytra are reddish-brown. The scales on the pronotum are dark in the middle and yellowish on the sides and along a median longitudinal band and the scutellum has dense, yellowish scales. The elytra have yellowish scales forming three longitudinal bands.
