= Dolichiomicroscelis colvillei =

Scientific classification
- Kingdom: Animalia
- Phylum: Arthropoda
- Clade: Pancrustacea
- Class: Insecta
- Order: Coleoptera
- Suborder: Polyphaga
- Infraorder: Scarabaeiformia
- Family: Scarabaeidae
- Genus: Dolichiomicroscelis
- Species: D. colvillei

Binomial name
- Dolichiomicroscelis colvillei Dombrow, 2007

Species of beetle

Dolichiomicroscelis colvillei is a species of beetle of the family Scarabaeidae. It is found in South Africa (Western Cape).
