= Blikana =

Scientific classification
- Kingdom: Animalia
- Phylum: Arthropoda
- Class: Insecta
- Order: Coleoptera
- Suborder: Polyphaga
- Infraorder: Scarabaeiformia
- Family: Scarabaeidae
- Subfamily: Melolonthinae
- Tribe: Hopliini
- Genus: Blikana; Péringuey, 1902
- Species: B. comosa

Binomial name
- Blikana comosa Péringuey, 1902

Genus of beetles

Blikana is a genus of beetle of the family Scarabaeidae. It is monotypic, being represented by the single species, Blikana comosa, which is found in South Africa (Western Cape).

== Description ==
Adults reach a length of about 7–8 mm (0.28–0.31 in). They are black, covered all over with a very long pubescence, which is fuscous brown on the pronotum, mixed with sub-flavescent greyish hairs on the elytra, where they form there four or five greyish longitudinal bands on each side. The abdomen, pectus, and legs are densely villose, with ashy-grey pubescence. The head and pronotum are very closely and somewhat roughly punctured.
