= Coega illota =

Scientific classification
- Kingdom: Animalia
- Phylum: Arthropoda
- Class: Insecta
- Order: Coleoptera
- Suborder: Polyphaga
- Infraorder: Scarabaeiformia
- Family: Scarabaeidae
- Subfamily: Melolonthinae
- Tribe: Hopliini
- Genus: Coega; Péringuey, 1902
- Species: C. illota

Binomial name
- Coega illota Péringuey, 1902

Genus of scarab beetles

Coega is a monotypic genus of monkey beetles in the family Scarabaeidae. Its sole species, Coega illota is found in the area of Worcester, South Africa.

== Description ==
Adults reach a length of about 6.25 mm (0.246 in). They are black and opaque, with the club of the antennae and tarsi piceous red and the elytra occasionally with a broad, lateral reddish band. The head is very scabrose and clothed with a flavescent pubescence. The pronotum is closely rugoso-punctate and clothed with very long, villose hairs. The elytra are elongate, slightly broader than the pronotum, sinuate laterally below the shoulders, but not much attenuate thence towards the apex. They are deeply and irregularly punctured, have two costules on each side, and from each scattered puncture springs a long appressed flavescent hair. The pygidium, under side and legs have a flavescent pubescence.

== Taxonomy ==
The genus Coega was later listed (recognising its validity) by Allsopp & Schoolmeesters, 2024.
