= Dolichoplia =

Scientific classification
- Kingdom: Animalia
- Phylum: Arthropoda
- Class: Insecta
- Order: Coleoptera
- Suborder: Polyphaga
- Infraorder: Scarabaeiformia
- Family: Scarabaeidae
- Subfamily: Melolonthinae
- Tribe: Hopliini
- Genus: Dolichoplia; Lacroix, 1998

Genus of leaf beetles

Dolichoplia is a genus of beetles belonging to the family Scarabaeidae.

== Species ==
- Dolichoplia diutina Lacroix, 1998
- Dolichoplia diuturna Lacroix, 1998
- Dolichoplia elongata Lacroix, 1998
- Dolichoplia longa Lacroix, 1998
- Dolichoplia longiqua Lacroix, 1998
- Dolichoplia longiuscula Lacroix, 1998
- Dolichoplia longula Lacroix, 1998
- Dolichoplia oblonga Lacroix, 1998
- Dolichoplia prolata Lacroix, 1998
