= Argoplia =

Scientific classification
- Kingdom: Animalia
- Phylum: Arthropoda
- Class: Insecta
- Order: Coleoptera
- Suborder: Polyphaga
- Infraorder: Scarabaeiformia
- Family: Scarabaeidae
- Subfamily: Melolonthinae
- Tribe: Hopliini
- Genus: Argoplia; Dombrow, 2003

Genus beetles

Argoplia is a genus of beetles belonging to the family Scarabaeidae.

== Species ==
- Argoplia glaberrimus (Burmeister, 1844)
- Argoplia grata (Péringuey, 1902)
