= Ceratochelus basilewskyi =

Scientific classification
- Kingdom: Animalia
- Phylum: Arthropoda
- Class: Insecta
- Order: Coleoptera
- Suborder: Polyphaga
- Infraorder: Scarabaeiformia
- Family: Scarabaeidae
- Genus: Ceratochelus
- Species: C. basilewskyi

Binomial name
- Ceratochelus basilewskyi (Schein, 1956)

Synonyms
- Monochelus basilewskyi Schein, 1956

Species of beetle

Ceratochelus basilewskyi is a species of scarab beetle in the subfamily Melolonthinae. It was first described by the German entomologist Hans Schein in 1956. It is found in Burundi, Kenya, Malawi, the Democratic Republic of the Congo and Rwanda.
