= Sceloclania virescens =

Scientific classification
- Kingdom: Animalia
- Phylum: Arthropoda
- Class: Insecta
- Order: Coleoptera
- Suborder: Polyphaga
- Infraorder: Scarabaeiformia
- Family: Scarabaeidae
- Genus: Sceloclania
- Species: S. virescens

Binomial name
- Sceloclania virescens (Péringuey, 1888)

Synonyms
- Scelophysa virescens Péringuey, 1888; Clania virescens; Lepisia virescens

Species of beetle

Sceloclania virescens is a species of beetle of the family Scarabaeidae. It is found in South Africa (Northern Cape).

== Description ==
Adults reach a length of about 9–10 mm (0.35–0.39 in). Males are completely covered on the upper side with minute round yellowish-green scales adjoining one another, except on the head. The elytra are testaceous red, but the colour of the background is hidden by the scales, which on the underside are whitish with a flavescent tinge. The legs are piceous red and the hind femora are scaly. Females are similar to males but a little more elongate and with the legs redder.
