= Dolichoplia oblonga =

Scientific classification
- Kingdom: Animalia
- Phylum: Arthropoda
- Class: Insecta
- Order: Coleoptera
- Suborder: Polyphaga
- Infraorder: Scarabaeiformia
- Family: Scarabaeidae
- Genus: Dolichoplia
- Species: D. oblonga

Binomial name
- Dolichoplia oblonga Lacroix, 1998

Species of beetle

Dolichoplia oblonga is a species of beetle of the family Scarabaeidae. It is found in Madagascar.

== Description ==
Adults reach a length of about 7 mm (0.28 in). They have a fairly massive body. The upper surface is reddish-brown with elongated, whitish scales.
