= Denticnema striatula =

Scientific classification
- Kingdom: Animalia
- Phylum: Arthropoda
- Class: Insecta
- Order: Coleoptera
- Suborder: Polyphaga
- Infraorder: Scarabaeiformia
- Family: Scarabaeidae
- Genus: Denticnema
- Species: D. striatula

Binomial name
- Denticnema striatula (Schein, 1959)

Synonyms
- Pachycnema (Denticnema) striatula Schein, 1959

Species of beetle

Denticnema striatula is a species of beetle of the family Scarabaeidae. It is found in South Africa (Western Cape, Northern Cape).

== Description ==
Adults reach a length of about 7 mm (0.28 in). They are black. The elytra are light brown at the base of the 10 grooves and densely white-yellow scaled therein. The pronotum has black hairs and the propygidium is densely covered with white scales. The pygidium and abdomen are not scaled, the thorax has white hairs and the legs are reddish-brown.
