= Hovachelus =

Scientific classification
- Kingdom: Animalia
- Phylum: Arthropoda
- Class: Insecta
- Order: Coleoptera
- Suborder: Polyphaga
- Infraorder: Scarabaeiformia
- Family: Scarabaeidae
- Subfamily: Melolonthinae
- Tribe: Hopliini
- Genus: Hovachelus; Fairmaire, 1897

Genus beetles

Hovachelus is a genus of beetles belonging to the family Scarabaeidae.

== Species ==
- Hovachelus oberthuri Fairmaire, 1897
- Hovachelus squamosulus Fairmaire, 1900
