= Nanaga =

Scientific classification
- Kingdom: Animalia
- Phylum: Arthropoda
- Class: Insecta
- Order: Coleoptera
- Suborder: Polyphaga
- Infraorder: Scarabaeiformia
- Family: Scarabaeidae
- Subfamily: Melolonthinae
- Tribe: Hopliini
- Genus: Nanaga; Péringuey, 1902
- Species: N. elegans

Binomial name
- Nanaga elegans Péringuey, 1902

Genus of beetles

Nanaga is a genus of beetle of the family Scarabaeidae. It is monotypic, being represented by the single species, Nanaga elegans, which is found in South Africa (Western Cape).

== Description ==
Adults reach a length of about 5.5–6 mm (0.22–0.24 in). They are black and opaque on the upper side, and slightly metallic underneath and on the legs. The pronotum and elytra are closely and distinctly shagreened, and the head and clypeus are strongly scabrose. The antennae are also black, but the club is slightly rufescent. The pronotum is clothed with a very long, ashy-grey, erect pubescence, the scutellum is pubescent and the elytra are very briefly pubescent. The pubescence is sub-erect and silky, greyish-white and a little more abundant along the suture, the base is setulose. The pygidial part, abdomen, and pectus are clothed with a greyish white pubescence.
