= Idutywa (beetle) =

Scientific classification
- Kingdom: Animalia
- Phylum: Arthropoda
- Class: Insecta
- Order: Coleoptera
- Suborder: Polyphaga
- Infraorder: Scarabaeiformia
- Family: Scarabaeidae
- Subfamily: Melolonthinae
- Tribe: Hopliini
- Genus: Idutywa; Péringuey, 1902

Genus of leaf beetles

Idutywa is a genus of beetles belonging to the family Scarabaeidae.

== Species ==
- Idutywa collaris (Burmeister, 1844)
- Idutywa vidua (Blanchard, 1850)
