= Dolichoplia diutina =

Scientific classification
- Kingdom: Animalia
- Phylum: Arthropoda
- Class: Insecta
- Order: Coleoptera
- Suborder: Polyphaga
- Infraorder: Scarabaeiformia
- Family: Scarabaeidae
- Genus: Dolichoplia
- Species: D. diutina

Binomial name
- Dolichoplia diutina Lacroix, 1998

Species of beetle

Dolichoplia diutina is a species of beetle of the family Scarabaeidae. It is found in Madagascar.

== Description ==
Adults reach a length of about 7 mm (0.28 in). The upper surface is reddish-brown with strong scaling.
