= Bizanus caliginosus =

Scientific classification
- Kingdom: Animalia
- Phylum: Arthropoda
- Class: Insecta
- Order: Coleoptera
- Suborder: Polyphaga
- Infraorder: Scarabaeiformia
- Family: Scarabaeidae
- Genus: Bizanus
- Species: B. caliginosus

Binomial name
- Bizanus caliginosus Péringuey, 1902

Species of beetle

Bizanus caliginosus is a species of beetle of the family Scarabaeidae. It is found in South Africa (Western Cape).

== Description ==
Adults reach a length of about 3.25–4 mm (0.128–0.157 in). Males are black, with the front legs rufescent, and the elytra chocolate brown and covered with nearly contiguous ashy-grey scales. The propygidium and abdomen have deep yellow scales, but the pygidium has none. The head is very rugose and the pronotum is scabroso-punctate and covered with somewhat dense, black and sub-flavescent hairs. The scutellum is covered with scales. The elytra are bi-costulate on each side, and the lanciform scales are set very close to each other, but they have no sheen and form a sort of tomentum. The pygidium is very briefly pubescent and has no scales. Females are similar to males, but more densely hairy and without scales on the scutellum, elytra, and pygidial part. The two striae between the costules of the elytra are deeper, and the latter instead of scales have a very short, erect, black pubescence. The pubescence on the pygidial part and the abdomen is often greyish white.
