= Hopleidos lineopictus =

Scientific classification
- Kingdom: Animalia
- Phylum: Arthropoda
- Class: Insecta
- Order: Coleoptera
- Suborder: Polyphaga
- Infraorder: Scarabaeiformia
- Family: Scarabaeidae
- Genus: Hopleidos
- Species: H. lineopictus

Binomial name
- Hopleidos lineopictus Künckel d'Herculais, 1887

Species of beetle

Hopleidos lineopictus is a species of beetle of the family Scarabaeidae. It is found in Madagascar.

== Description ==
Adults reach a length of about 11 mm (0.43 in). They have an elongated body. The upper surface is deep black with a broad bands of whitish scales.
