= Omocnemus kochi =

Scientific classification
- Kingdom: Animalia
- Phylum: Arthropoda
- Class: Insecta
- Order: Coleoptera
- Suborder: Polyphaga
- Infraorder: Scarabaeiformia
- Family: Scarabaeidae
- Genus: Omocnemus
- Species: O. kochi

Binomial name
- Omocnemus kochi Schein, 1958

Species of beetle

Omocnemus kochi is a species of beetle of the family Scarabaeidae. It is found in Namibia.

== Description ==
Adults reach a length of about 5–6 mm (0.20–0.24 in). They are black, with reddish-brown elytra which are darkened at the rear and have whitish-yellow hairs. The pygidium has yellow scales. The forelegs are pitch-black, while the remaining legs are reddish-brown.
