= Oberthuroplia perroti =

Scientific classification
- Kingdom: Animalia
- Phylum: Arthropoda
- Class: Insecta
- Order: Coleoptera
- Suborder: Polyphaga
- Infraorder: Scarabaeiformia
- Family: Scarabaeidae
- Genus: Oberthuroplia
- Species: O. perroti

Binomial name
- Oberthuroplia perroti Lacroix, 1998

Species of beetle

Oberthuroplia perroti is a species of beetle of the family Scarabaeidae. It is found in Madagascar.

== Description ==
Adults reach a length of about 6 mm (0.24 in). The upper surface is dark brown densely covered with chocolate brown and yellow scales forming patterns.
