= Oberthuroplia multifasciata =

Scientific classification
- Kingdom: Animalia
- Phylum: Arthropoda
- Class: Insecta
- Order: Coleoptera
- Suborder: Polyphaga
- Infraorder: Scarabaeiformia
- Family: Scarabaeidae
- Genus: Oberthuroplia
- Species: O. multifasciata

Binomial name
- Oberthuroplia multifasciata (Fairmaire, 1897)

Synonyms
- Hoplia multifasciata Fairmaire, 1897

Species of beetle

Oberthuroplia multifasciata is a species of beetle of the family Scarabaeidae. It is found in Madagascar.

== Description ==
Adults reach a length of about 8–9 mm (0.31–0.35 in). The upper surface is reddish-brown with broad, dense, round, yellow, scaly bands.
