= Blanchardoplia parvula =

Scientific classification
- Kingdom: Animalia
- Phylum: Arthropoda
- Class: Insecta
- Order: Coleoptera
- Suborder: Polyphaga
- Infraorder: Scarabaeiformia
- Family: Scarabaeidae
- Genus: Blanchardoplia
- Species: B. parvula

Binomial name
- Blanchardoplia parvula Lacroix, 1998

Species of beetle

Blanchardoplia parvula is a species of beetle of the family Scarabaeidae. It is found in Madagascar.

== Description ==
Adults reach a length of about 4.5–5.5 mm (0.18–0.22 in). They have a rather oval body. The upper surface is yellowish-brown with fine hairs.
