= Hopliopsis badia =

Scientific classification
- Kingdom: Animalia
- Phylum: Arthropoda
- Class: Insecta
- Order: Coleoptera
- Suborder: Polyphaga
- Infraorder: Scarabaeiformia
- Family: Scarabaeidae
- Genus: Hopliopsis
- Species: H. badia

Binomial name
- Hopliopsis badia Lacroix, 1998

Species of beetle

Hopliopsis badia is a species of beetle of the family Scarabaeidae. It is found in Madagascar.

== Description ==
Adults reach a length of about 6 mm (0.24 in). They have an elongated body. The upper surface is dark brown with fine hairs.
