= Hoplocnemis spectabilis =

Scientific classification
- Kingdom: Animalia
- Phylum: Arthropoda
- Class: Insecta
- Order: Coleoptera
- Suborder: Polyphaga
- Infraorder: Scarabaeiformia
- Family: Scarabaeidae
- Genus: Hoplocnemis
- Species: H. spectabilis

Binomial name
- Hoplocnemis spectabilis Péringuey, 1902

Species of beetle

Hoplocnemis spectabilis is a species of beetle of the family Scarabaeidae. It is found in South Africa (KwaZulu-Natal, Western Cape).

== Description ==
Adults reach a length of about 15 mm (0.59 in). They are similar to Hoplocnemis hylax, but it differs in colour and in the shape of the cephalic horn and of the posterior tibiae. The colour is dull black on the upper side, the hind legs are also piceous black. The club of the antennae is rufescent. The shape of the head and clypeus is similar, but the cephalic horn is compressed laterally and sharply triangular. The pronotum is a little more pubescent on the discoidal part, and the median sulcus is broader.
