= Gymnoloma perplexa =

Scientific classification
- Kingdom: Animalia
- Phylum: Arthropoda
- Class: Insecta
- Order: Coleoptera
- Suborder: Polyphaga
- Infraorder: Scarabaeiformia
- Family: Scarabaeidae
- Genus: Gymnoloma
- Species: G. perplexa

Binomial name
- Gymnoloma perplexa Péringuey, 1902

Species of beetle

Gymnoloma perplexa is a species of beetle of the family Scarabaeidae. It is found in South Africa (Cape).

== Description ==
Adults reach a length of about 7 mm (0.28 in). They are black, with the elytra chocolate-brown. The pronotum is sprinkled with sub-flavescent, numerous scales scattered on the discoidal part, but not forming bands, and denser along the outer and the basal margins. The scutellum is very little scaly and the elytra have on each side a sutural and two discoidal narrow bands of minute sub-flavescent scales as well as a marginal one, often, however, partly obliterated or merging near the shoulder into the outer discoidal one. The pygidial part and underside are densely scaly, the scales not quite contiguous.
