= Denticnema morbillosa =

Scientific classification
- Kingdom: Animalia
- Phylum: Arthropoda
- Class: Insecta
- Order: Coleoptera
- Suborder: Polyphaga
- Infraorder: Scarabaeiformia
- Family: Scarabaeidae
- Genus: Denticnema
- Species: D. morbillosa

Binomial name
- Denticnema morbillosa (Burmeister, 1844)

Synonyms
- Pachycnema morbillosa Burmeister, 1844; Denticnema morbillosum

Species of beetle

Denticnema morbillosa is a species of beetle of the family Scarabaeidae. It is found in Namibia and South Africa (Western Cape, Northern Cape).

== Description ==
Adults reach a length of about 8–10 mm (0.31–0.39 in). The head and pronotum are black, clothed with dense, long black hairs and with white scales along the margin of the base only. The elytra are red, covered with contiguous, round, white scales, and with one sutural, three discoidal and one supra-marginal row of remote, scar-like spots on each side, each bearing a stiff, stout seta. The legs are red. In females, the elytra are flavescent, covered with yellowish scales and the series of setiferous spots is less conspicuous. The pygidium is not scaly in either sex.
