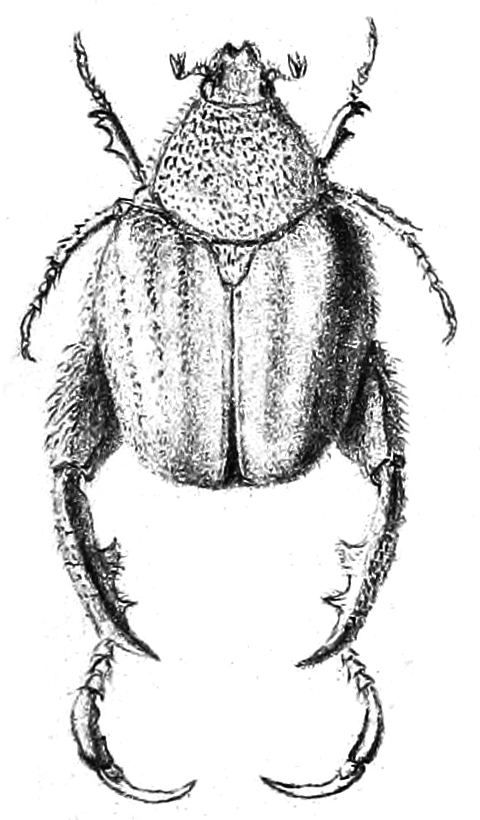

Scientific classification
- Kingdom: Animalia
- Phylum: Arthropoda
- Class: Insecta
- Order: Coleoptera
- Suborder: Polyphaga
- Infraorder: Scarabaeiformia
- Family: Scarabaeidae
- Genus: Denticnema
- Species: D. striata

Binomial name
- Denticnema striata (Burmeister, 1844)

Synonyms
- Pachycnema striata Burmeister, 1844; Pachycnema (Denticnema) striata feminiformis Schein, 1959; Denticnema striatum

= Denticnema striata =

Species of beetle

Denticnema striata is a species of beetle of the family Scarabaeidae. It is found in South Africa (Western Cape, Northern Cape).

== Description ==
Adults reach a length of about 10.5–11.5 mm (0.41–0.45 in). The head and pronotum are black and the elytra are reddish-brown with five broad uninterrupted bands of white scales on each side. The legs are brownish red.

== Subspecies ==
- Denticnema striata striata (Western Cape, Northern Cape)
- Denticnema striata feminiformis (Schein, 1959) (Western Cape, Northern Cape)
