= Stigmatoplia ornata =

Scientific classification
- Kingdom: Animalia
- Phylum: Arthropoda
- Class: Insecta
- Order: Coleoptera
- Suborder: Polyphaga
- Infraorder: Scarabaeiformia
- Family: Scarabaeidae
- Genus: Stigmatoplia
- Species: S. ornata

Binomial name
- Stigmatoplia ornata (Burmeister, 1844)

Synonyms
- Gymnoloma ornata Burmeister, 1844

Species of beetle

Stigmatoplia ornata is a species of beetle of the family Scarabaeidae. It is found in South Africa (Northern Cape).

== Description ==
Adults reach a length of about 7–8 mm (0.28–0.31 in). Males are black, with the intermediate and posterior legs red. The pronotum has a median longitudinal band of flavescent scales, a discoidal one interrupted in the middle and an outer marginal one. The scutellum is densely scaly and the elytra have eight elongated patches of yellowish scales on each side. The propygidium, pygidium and abdomen are clothed with contiguous yellowish scales. The shape of the females is similar to that of the males, but the pronotum is clothed with very dense yellowish hairs. The scutellum is scaly, the scales being flavescent white, and the whole surface of the elytra is covered with contiguous yellow scales entirely surrounding the elongated patches which are disposed as in the male, but the scales of which are paler than those forming the background.
