= Rhachistoplia =

Scientific classification
- Kingdom: Animalia
- Phylum: Arthropoda
- Class: Insecta
- Order: Coleoptera
- Suborder: Polyphaga
- Infraorder: Scarabaeiformia
- Family: Scarabaeidae
- Subfamily: Melolonthinae
- Tribe: Hopliini
- Genus: Rhachistoplia; Lacroix, 1997
- Species: R. aurata

Binomial name
- Rhachistoplia aurata Lacroix, 1997

Genus of beetles

Rhachistoplia is a genus of beetle of the family Scarabaeidae. It is monotypic, being represented by the single species, Rhachistoplia aurata, which is found in Madagascar.

== Description ==
Adults reach a length of about 6–8 mm (0.24–0.31 in). They have a slightly elongated body with parallel elytral sides. The upper surface is reddish-brown covered with intense yellow scales.
