= Perabula morosa =

Scientific classification
- Kingdom: Animalia
- Phylum: Arthropoda
- Class: Insecta
- Order: Coleoptera
- Suborder: Polyphaga
- Infraorder: Scarabaeiformia
- Family: Scarabaeidae
- Genus: Perabula
- Species: P. morosa

Binomial name
- Perabula morosa (Péringuey, 1902)

Synonyms
- Rabula morosa Péringuey, 1902

Species of beetle

Perabula morosa is a species of beetle of the family Scarabaeidae. It is found in South Africa (Western Cape).

== Description ==
Adults reach a length of about 7 mm (0.28 in). They are fuscous brown, opaque, and clothed with some slightly remote, appressed minute ashy-grey hairs. The head and pronotum are covered with cicatricose shallow punctures from the centre of which springs a very short bristle. The pronotum also has a shallow but plainly visible longitudinal furrow. The scutellum has a few small appressed hairs and the elytra are plainly tri-costate on the discoidal part and also have another costa above the outer margin, the suture is also raised, and the sculpture consists of closely set cicatricose punctures a little more closely set than on the pronotum, and bearing likewise a very small appressed hair, but the costae and the suture have in addition a series of distant, short setae. The pygidium and abdomen have scattered minute hairs and the legs are punctate and have similarly appressed hairs.
