= Dilatatoplia =

Scientific classification
- Kingdom: Animalia
- Phylum: Arthropoda
- Class: Insecta
- Order: Coleoptera
- Suborder: Polyphaga
- Infraorder: Scarabaeiformia
- Family: Scarabaeidae
- Subfamily: Melolonthinae
- Tribe: Hopliini
- Genus: Dilatatoplia; Lacroix, 1998
- Species: D. henrici

Binomial name
- Dilatatoplia henrici (Fairmaire, 1899)

Synonyms
- Hovachelus henrici Fairmaire, 1899

Genus of beetles

Dilatatoplia is a genus of beetle of the family Scarabaeidae. It is monotypic, being represented by the single species, Dilatatoplia henrici, which is found in Madagascar.

== Description ==
Adults reach a length of about 10 mm (0.39 in). They have a short, stocky body. The upper surface is reddish-brown with sparse scaly hairs.
