= Knysna (beetle) =

Scientific classification
- Kingdom: Animalia
- Phylum: Arthropoda
- Class: Insecta
- Order: Coleoptera
- Suborder: Polyphaga
- Infraorder: Scarabaeiformia
- Family: Scarabaeidae
- Subfamily: Melolonthinae
- Tribe: Hopliini
- Genus: Knysna; Péringuey, 1902

Genus of beetles

Knysna is a genus of monkey beetles in the family Scarabaeidae. These species are found in South Africa.

== Species ==
These 4 species belong to the genus Knysna:

- Knysna endroedyi Dombrow, 2006
- Knysna heidenreichi Dombrow, 2006
- Knysna humeralis (Burmeister, 1844)
- Knysna sulcicollis (Blanchard, 1850)
