= Tsaratanoplia =

Scientific classification
- Kingdom: Animalia
- Phylum: Arthropoda
- Class: Insecta
- Order: Coleoptera
- Suborder: Polyphaga
- Infraorder: Scarabaeiformia
- Family: Scarabaeidae
- Subfamily: Melolonthinae
- Tribe: Hopliini
- Genus: Tsaratanoplia; Lacroix, 1997
- Species: T. sogai

Binomial name
- Tsaratanoplia sogai Lacroix, 1997

Genus of beetles

Tsaratanoplia is a genus of beetle of the family Scarabaeidae. It is monotypic, being represented by the single species, Tsaratanoplia sogai, which is found in Madagascar.

== Description ==
Adults reach a length of about 5.5–8 mm (0.22–0.31 in). They have an elongated body. The upper surface is brown, more or less dark, with fine scaly hairs.
