= Dolichoplia diuturna =

Scientific classification
- Kingdom: Animalia
- Phylum: Arthropoda
- Class: Insecta
- Order: Coleoptera
- Suborder: Polyphaga
- Infraorder: Scarabaeiformia
- Family: Scarabaeidae
- Genus: Dolichoplia
- Species: D. diuturna

Binomial name
- Dolichoplia diuturna Lacroix, 1998

Species of beetle

Dolichoplia diuturna is a species of beetle of the family Scarabaeidae. It is found in Madagascar.

== Description ==
Adults reach a length of about 6–7 mm (0.24–0.28 in). The upper surface is dark brown with a more or less reddish tinge and with fine, whitish scales.
