= Dolichoplia elongata =

Scientific classification
- Kingdom: Animalia
- Phylum: Arthropoda
- Class: Insecta
- Order: Coleoptera
- Suborder: Polyphaga
- Infraorder: Scarabaeiformia
- Family: Scarabaeidae
- Genus: Dolichoplia
- Species: D. elongata

Binomial name
- Dolichoplia elongata Lacroix, 1998

Species of beetle

Dolichoplia elongata is a species of beetle of the family Scarabaeidae. It is found in Madagascar.

== Description ==
Adults reach a length of about 7–8 mm (0.28–0.31 in). The upper surface is reddish-brown with scaly, whitish hairs.
