= Phillsoppia strigosa =

Scientific classification
- Kingdom: Animalia
- Phylum: Arthropoda
- Class: Insecta
- Order: Coleoptera
- Suborder: Polyphaga
- Infraorder: Scarabaeiformia
- Family: Scarabaeidae
- Genus: Phillsoppia
- Species: P. strigosa

Binomial name
- Phillsoppia strigosa (Burmeister, 1844)

Synonyms
- Gymnoloma strigosa Burmeister, 1844; Leptocnemis strigosa

Species of beetle

Phillsoppia strigosa is a species of beetle of the family Scarabaeidae. It is found in South Africa (Eastern Cape, Western Cape).

== Description ==
Adults reach a length of about 7–8 mm (0.28–0.31 in). Males are black, with the elytra chestnut-brown and opaque. The pronotum has a median and an outer marginal band of white, somewhat dense scales, which also form a partly obliterated one along the base. The scutellum is scaly and the elytra have a sutural, two discoidal and an outer marginal line of white scales. The pygidium and underside are densely scaly, the former having a denuded median basal patch. Females are similar to males, but have an elongate, sharply triangular patch of flavescent scales on the pygidium.
