= Hopliopsis fulvovestita =

Scientific classification
- Kingdom: Animalia
- Phylum: Arthropoda
- Class: Insecta
- Order: Coleoptera
- Suborder: Polyphaga
- Infraorder: Scarabaeiformia
- Family: Scarabaeidae
- Genus: Hopliopsis
- Species: H. fulvovestita

Binomial name
- Hopliopsis fulvovestita Blanchard, 1850

Synonyms
- Hopliopsis fulvovestitus

Species of beetle

Hopliopsis fulvovestita is a species of beetle of the family Scarabaeidae. It is found in Madagascar.

== Description ==
Adults reach a length of about 10–12 mm (0.39–0.47 in). They have a elongated body. The upper surface is orange-brown with fine, regular, fairly dense hairs.
