= Ceratochelus =

Scientific classification
- Kingdom: Animalia
- Phylum: Arthropoda
- Clade: Pancrustacea
- Class: Insecta
- Order: Coleoptera
- Suborder: Polyphaga
- Infraorder: Scarabaeiformia
- Family: Scarabaeidae
- Subfamily: Melolonthinae
- Tribe: Hopliini
- Genus: Ceratochelus; Dombrow, 2002

Genus beetles

Ceratochelus is a genus of beetles belonging to the family Scarabaeidae.

== Species ==
- Ceratochelus basilewskyi (Schein, 1956)
- Ceratochelus cathedralpeakensis Dombrow, 2002
- Ceratochelus cyanometallicus Dombrow, 2002
- Ceratochelus elangatulus (Blanchard, 1850)
- Ceratochelus tzaneensis Dombrow, 2002
- Ceratochelus unyikabogomontanus Dombrow, 2002
