= Macropliopsis =

Scientific classification
- Kingdom: Animalia
- Phylum: Arthropoda
- Class: Insecta
- Order: Coleoptera
- Suborder: Polyphaga
- Infraorder: Scarabaeiformia
- Family: Scarabaeidae
- Subfamily: Melolonthinae
- Tribe: Hopliini
- Genus: Macropliopsis; Lacroix, 1997
- Species: M. perroti

Binomial name
- Macropliopsis perroti Lacroix, 1997

Genus of beetles

Macropliopsis is a genus of beetle of the family Scarabaeidae. It is monotypic, being represented by the single species, Macropliopsis perroti, which is found in Madagascar.

== Description ==
Adults reach a length of about 11–14 mm (0.43–0.55 in). They have a massive body. The upper surface is dark brown to blackish, with sparse scaling arranged in spots. It has a satin-like appearance.
