= Oreogenoplia =

Scientific classification
- Kingdom: Animalia
- Phylum: Arthropoda
- Class: Insecta
- Order: Coleoptera
- Suborder: Polyphaga
- Infraorder: Scarabaeiformia
- Family: Scarabaeidae
- Subfamily: Melolonthinae
- Tribe: Hopliini
- Genus: Oreogenoplia; Lacroix, 1998
- Species: O. solitaria

Binomial name
- Oreogenoplia solitaria Lacroix, 1998

Genus of beetles

Oreogenoplia is a genus of beetle of the family Scarabaeidae. It is monotypic, being represented by the single species, Oreogenoplia solitaria, which is found in Madagascar.

== Description ==
Adults reach a length of about 8–9 mm (0.31–0.35 in). They have a massive, oval body. The pronotum is orange and the elytra are reddish-brown.
