= Ectinohoplia =

Scientific classification
- Kingdom: Animalia
- Phylum: Arthropoda
- Class: Insecta
- Order: Coleoptera
- Suborder: Polyphaga
- Infraorder: Scarabaeiformia
- Family: Scarabaeidae
- Subfamily: Melolonthinae
- Tribe: Hopliini
- Genus: Ectinohoplia; Redtenbacher, 1868

Synonyms
- Spinohoplia Sabatinelli, 1997

Genus of leaf beetles

Ectinohoplia is a genus of beetles belonging to the family Scarabaeidae.

== Species ==
- Ectinohoplia affinis Arrow, 1921
- Ectinohoplia ahrensis (Sabatinelli, 1997)
- Ectinohoplia arrowi Miwa, 1931
- Ectinohoplia auriventris Moser, 1915
- Ectinohoplia balthasari Tesař, 1963
- Ectinohoplia caelaminis Prokofiev, 2015
- Ectinohoplia chlorophylla Prokofiev, 2015
- Ectinohoplia chocolata Prokofiev, 2015
- Ectinohoplia ctenicera Prokofiev, 2015
- Ectinohoplia davidis Fairmaire, 1889
- Ectinohoplia dikobrasa Prokofiev, 2015
- Ectinohoplia egregia (Arrow, 1932)
- Ectinohoplia excisicollis Frey, 1966
- Ectinohoplia flavicauda Arrow, 1921
- Ectinohoplia formosana Moser, 1919
- Ectinohoplia fujiana Kobayashi, 2017
- Ectinohoplia gracilipes (Lewis, 1895)
- Ectinohoplia guttaticollis Fairmaire, 1900
- Ectinohoplia harpagon (Fairmaire, 1887)
- Ectinohoplia hieroglyphica Moser, 1912
- Ectinohoplia inscripta Arrow, 1921
- Ectinohoplia jucunda (Arrow, 1932)
- Ectinohoplia latipes Arrow, 1921
- Ectinohoplia mus Nonfried, 1895
- Ectinohoplia nantouensis Kobayashi, 1995
- Ectinohoplia nitidicauda Arrow, 1921
- Ectinohoplia obducta (Motschulsky, 1857)
- Ectinohoplia oculicauda Arrow, 1921
- Ectinohoplia paivae (Wollaston, 1859)
- Ectinohoplia papa Prokofiev, 2015
- Ectinohoplia puella Endrödi, 1952
- Ectinohoplia quadrituberculata Preudhomme de Borre, 1886
- Ectinohoplia rufipes (Motschulsky, 1860)
- Ectinohoplia saetuligera Kobayashi, 2021
- Ectinohoplia sakaii Kobayashi & Fujioka, 2015
- Ectinohoplia sichuanana Kobayashi, 2021
- Ectinohoplia simianshana Kobayashi & Fujioka, 2015
- Ectinohoplia simillima Kobayashi & Fujioka, 2015
- Ectinohoplia sinuaticollis Moser, 1912
- Ectinohoplia soror Arrow, 1921
- Ectinohoplia squamigera (Hope, 1831)
- Ectinohoplia sulphuriventris Redtenbacher, 1868
- Ectinohoplia suturalis Preudhomme de Borre, 1886
- Ectinohoplia tibialis Arrow, 1921
- Ectinohoplia trichota Jacobson, 1914
- Ectinohoplia triplagiata Fairmaire, 1897
- Ectinohoplia triserialis Kobayashi, 2017
- Ectinohoplia viridilineata Kobayashi & Fujioka, 2015
- Ectinohoplia xenella Prokofiev, 2015
- Ectinohoplia yoi Sawada, 1939
- Ectinohoplia yunnana Moser, 1919
