= Hopleidos =

Scientific classification
- Kingdom: Animalia
- Phylum: Arthropoda
- Class: Insecta
- Order: Coleoptera
- Suborder: Polyphaga
- Infraorder: Scarabaeiformia
- Family: Scarabaeidae
- Subfamily: Melolonthinae
- Tribe: Hopliini
- Genus: Hopleidos; Künckel d'Herculais, 1887

Genus of leaf beetles

Hopleidos is a genus of beetles belonging to the family Scarabaeidae.

== Species ==
- Hopleidos echinatus Lacroix, 1998
- Hopleidos lineolatus Lacroix, 1998
- Hopleidos lineopictus Künckel D'Herculais, 1887
