= Bizanus =

Scientific classification
- Kingdom: Animalia
- Phylum: Arthropoda
- Class: Insecta
- Order: Coleoptera
- Suborder: Polyphaga
- Infraorder: Scarabaeiformia
- Family: Scarabaeidae
- Subfamily: Melolonthinae
- Tribe: Hopliini
- Genus: Bizanus; Péringuey, 1902

Genus beetles

Bizanus is a genus of beetles belonging to the family Scarabaeidae.

== Species ==
- Bizanus caliginosus Péringuey, 1902
- Bizanus vansoni Schein, 1958
