= Hoplocnemis hessei =

Scientific classification
- Kingdom: Animalia
- Phylum: Arthropoda
- Class: Insecta
- Order: Coleoptera
- Suborder: Polyphaga
- Infraorder: Scarabaeiformia
- Family: Scarabaeidae
- Genus: Hoplocnemis
- Species: H. hessei

Binomial name
- Hoplocnemis hessei Schein, 1959

Species of beetle

Hoplocnemis hessei is a species of beetle of the family Scarabaeidae. It is found in South Africa (Western Cape).

== Description ==
Adults reach a length of about 10 mm (0.39 in). They are pitch-black with dark brick-red elytra.
