= Euknemoplia virgulata =

Scientific classification
- Kingdom: Animalia
- Phylum: Arthropoda
- Class: Insecta
- Order: Coleoptera
- Suborder: Polyphaga
- Infraorder: Scarabaeiformia
- Family: Scarabaeidae
- Genus: Euknemoplia
- Species: E. virgulata

Binomial name
- Euknemoplia virgulata Lacroix, 1997

Species of beetle

Euknemoplia virgulata is a species of beetle of the family Scarabaeidae. It is found in Madagascar.

== Description ==
Adults reach a length of about 6–7 mm (0.24–0.28 in). They have an elongated body. The upper surface has dense oval scaling forming denser and lighter longitudinal bands.
