= Gymnoloma subsulcata =

Scientific classification
- Kingdom: Animalia
- Phylum: Arthropoda
- Class: Insecta
- Order: Coleoptera
- Suborder: Polyphaga
- Infraorder: Scarabaeiformia
- Family: Scarabaeidae
- Genus: Gymnoloma
- Species: G. subsulcata

Binomial name
- Gymnoloma subsulcata Burmeister, 1844

Species of beetle

Gymnoloma subsulcata is a species of beetle of the family Scarabaeidae. It is found in South Africa (Northern Cape).

== Description ==
Adults reach a length of about 6 mm (0.24 in). They are black, covered with very short greyish hairs on the head and pronotum, the latter being fringed with bristly marginal long hairs, and the median sulcus and the sides have a few scattered, elongate whitish scales, which sparsely cover the scutellum. The elytra are distinctly bi-costulate on each side, the outer costa disappearing past the median part, and the space between the costae is filled with not closely set, elongate white scales, the whole pygidial part and underside are densely scaly, the scales being elongate.
