= Knysna sulcicollis =

Scientific classification
- Kingdom: Animalia
- Phylum: Arthropoda
- Class: Insecta
- Order: Coleoptera
- Suborder: Polyphaga
- Infraorder: Scarabaeiformia
- Family: Scarabaeidae
- Genus: Knysna
- Species: K. sulcicollis

Binomial name
- Knysna sulcicollis (Blanchard, 1850)

Synonyms
- Gymnoloma sulcicollis Blanchard, 1850

Species of beetle

Knysna sulcicollis is a species of beetle of the family Scarabaeidae. It is found in South Africa (Western Cape).

== Description ==
Adults reach a length of about 6–7.5 mm (0.24–0.30 in). Males are black with the legs reddish, except the hind tibiae and tarsi, which are black. The head is densely clothed with elongate, somewhat hair-like ashy-grey scales, and the pronotum has a median and a supra-lateral band of similar scales that also cover the outer margin. The scutellum, elytra, pygidial part, and abdomen are clothed with very closely set but not contiguous elongate scales of the same pattern as those on the pronotum. Females are similar to males, but less densely scaly, and with the costule on the elytra more distinct.
