= Embrithoplia =

Scientific classification
- Kingdom: Animalia
- Phylum: Arthropoda
- Class: Insecta
- Order: Coleoptera
- Suborder: Polyphaga
- Infraorder: Scarabaeiformia
- Family: Scarabaeidae
- Subfamily: Melolonthinae
- Tribe: Hopliini
- Genus: Embrithoplia; Lacroix, 1998
- Species: E. vitticollis

Binomial name
- Embrithoplia vitticollis (Fairmaire, 1897)

Synonyms
- Hoplia vitticollis Fairmaire, 1897

Genus of beetles

Embrithoplia is a genus of beetle of the family Scarabaeidae. It is monotypic, being represented by the single species, Embrithoplia vitticollis, which is found in Madagascar.

== Description ==
Adults reach a length of about 7–8 mm (0.28–0.31 in). They have a short, broad body. The upper surface has dense, elongated scales forming patterns.
