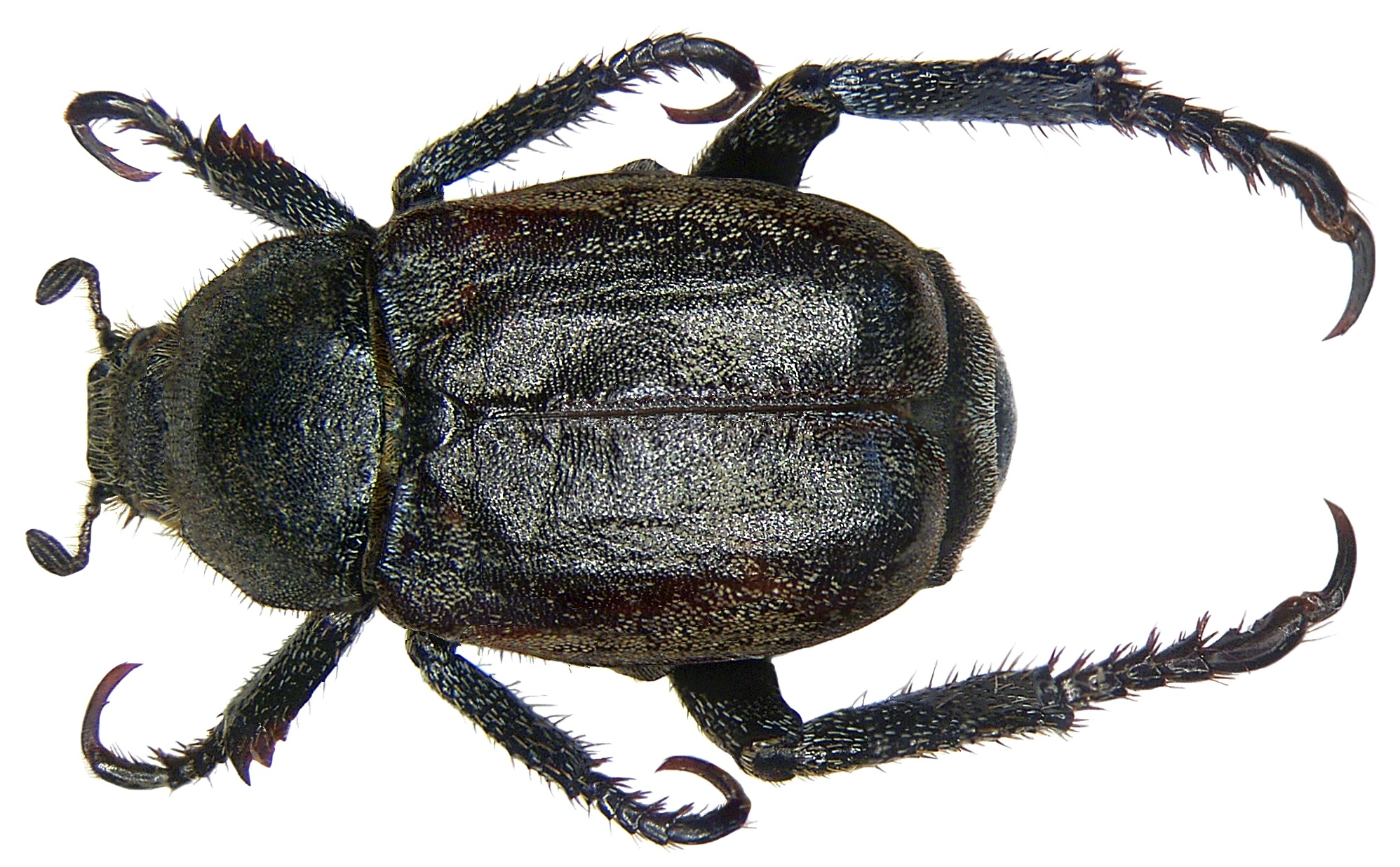
- Hoplia philanthus

Scientific classification
- Kingdom: Animalia
- Phylum: Arthropoda
- Clade: Pancrustacea
- Class: Insecta
- Order: Coleoptera
- Suborder: Polyphaga
- Infraorder: Scarabaeiformia
- Family: Scarabaeidae
- Subfamily: Melolonthinae
- Tribe: Hopliini; Latreille, 1829

Synonyms
- Hoplides Lacordaire, 1855; Anisochelidae Burmeister, 1844; Gymnolominae Burmeister, 1844; Heterochlinae Burmeister, 1844; Hopliadae Burmeister, 1844; Lepisiidae Burmeister, 1844; Pachycnemidae Burmeister, 1844; Hopliaires Mulsant, 1842

= Monkey beetle =

Tribe of beetles

Monkey beetles are scarab beetles, a group of around 70 genera and 850 described species within the tribe Hopliini. The placement of this tribe within the family Scarabaeidae is uncertain between Melolonthinae and Rutelinae. Many species visit flowers for pollen and nectar, or to browse on the petals. The beetles are important pollinators of Aizoaceae and Asteraceae in grazed and ungrazed areas, as well as many others.

They tend to favor flowers of white, yellow, pink, orange, and blue pigments. They also tend to favor flowers of symmetrical, abstract patterns. Due to their pollination patterns, many plants evolved special features in order to attract monkey beetles, such as the Iridaceae which now have bright colors and symmetrical, unique patterns.

== Genera ==
These 70 or so genera belong to the tribe Hopliini (subtribe: Hopliina):

- Amblymelanoplia Dombrow, 2002
- Amorphochelus Fairmaire, 1898
- Anisochelus Burmeister, 1844
- Argoplia Dombrow, 2003
- Athesphatoplia Lacroix, 1998
- Beckhoplia Dombrow, 2005
- Bizanus Péringuey, 1902
- Blanchardoplia Lacroix, 1998
- Blikana Péringuey, 1902
- Burmeistoplia Dombrow, 2003
- Caesariatoplia Lacroix, 1998
- Calliferoplia Lacroix, 1998
- Ceratochelus Dombrow, 2002
- Chasme Le Peletier & Serville, 1828
- Coega Péringuey, 1902
- Comoramorphochelus Lacroix, 1997
- Cylichnus Burmeister, 1844
- Cylindrocrates Schein, 1958
- Delphinobius Fairmaire, 1900
- Dentatoplia Lacroix, 1997
- Dentiheterochelus Dombrow, 2002
- Diaplochelus Burmeister, 1844
- Dicentrines Burmeister, 1844
- Dichelhoplia Blanchard, 1850
- Dichelus Le Peletier de Saint-Fargeau & Audinet-Serville, 1828
- Dicranocnemus Burmeister, 1844
- Dilatatoplia Lacroix, 1998
- Dolichiomicroscelis Dombrow, 2003
- Dolichoplia Lacroix, 1998
- Dombrocnemis Allsopp & Schoolmeesters, 2024 (≡ Toxocnemis Dombrow, 2002)
- Echyra Erichson, 1847
- Ectinohoplia Redtenbacher, 1868
- Embrithoplia Lacroix, 1998
- Eremoplia Kolbe, 1914
- Eriesthis Burmeister, 1844
- Euknemoplia Lacroix, 1997
- Eulaiades Fairmaire, 1899
- Fairmairoplia Lacroix, 1997
- Goniaspidius Burmeister, 1844
- Gouna Péringuey, 1902
- Grammodoplia Lacroix, 1997
- Gymnoloma Dejean, 1833
- Gyroplia Brenske, 1893
- Harpina Burmeister, 1844
- Heterochelus Burmeister, 1844
- Himalhoplia Sabatinelli, 1983
- Homopliopsis Lacroix, 1998
- Hoplebaea Brenske, 1899
- Hopleidos Künckel D'Herculais, 1887
- Hoplia Illiger, 1803
- Hopliopsis Blanchard, 1850
- Hoplocnemis Harold, 1869
- Hoplorida Moser, 1918
- Hovachelus Fairmaire, 1897
- Idutywa Péringuey, 1902
- Inanda Péringuey, 1902
- Kareiga Péringuey, 1902
- Khoina Péringuey, 1902
- Knysna Péringuey, 1902
- Korisaba Péringuey, 1902
- Kubousa Péringuey, 1902
- Laceratoplia Lacroix, 1997
- Lepisia Le Peletier & Serville, 1828
- Lepithrix Le Peletier & Serville, 1828
- Lepitrichula Schein, 1959
- Macroplia Brenske, 1898
- Macropliopsis Lacroix, 1997
- Madahoplia Lacroix, 1998
- Mauromecistoplia Dombrow, 2002
- Megistoplia Lacroix, 1997
- Michaeloplia Lacroix, 1997
- Microplidus Péringuey, 1902
- Microplus Burmeister, 1844
- Minutoplia Lacroix, 1998
- Mitrophorus Burmeister, 1844
- Monochelus Le Peletier & Serville, 1828
- Nanaga Péringuey, 1902
- Nanniscus Burmeister, 1844
- Nesohoplia Scott, 1912
- Nigroplia Dombrow, 2002
- Oberthuroplia Lacroix, 1998
- Odontoplia Fairmaire, 1897
- Omocnemus Schein, 1958
- Omocrates Burmeister, 1844
- Oreogenoplia Lacroix, 1998
- Outeniqua Péringuey, 1902
- Paraceratochelus Dombrow, 2002
- Paramicroplus Lacroix, 1998
- Paramorphochelus Lacroix, 1997
- Pareriesthis Moser, 1918
- Paroplia Fairmaire, 1903
- Perabula Allsopp & Schoolmeesters, 2024 (≡ Rabula Péringuey, 1902)
- Phillsoppia Allsopp & Schoolmeesters, 2024 (≡ Leptocnemis Dombrow, 2001)
- Platychelus Burmeister, 1844
- Pseudheterochelus Schein, 1959
- Pseudocongella Moser, 1924
- Pseudomicroplus Lacroix, 1998
- Pseudoparoplia Lacroix, 1997
- Pseudouteniqua Schein, 1959
- Rectoscutaria Schein, 1958
- Rhachistoplia Lacroix, 1997
- Rimuloplia Lacroix, 1997
- Sabatinelloplia Lacroix, 1998
- Scelidothrix Dombrow, 2001
- Sceloclania Schein, 1958
- Scelophysa Burmeister, 1844
- Stigmatoplia Dombrow, 2001
- Thabina Péringuey, 1902
- Thoracoplia Prokofiev, 2015
- Tsaratanoplia Lacroix, 1997
- Vansoniola Schein, 1958

These 4 genera belong to the tribe Hopliini (subtribe: Pachycnemina):

- Anisonyx Latreille, 1807
- Denticnema Schein, 1959
- Pachycnema Le Peletier de Saint-Fargeau & Audinet-Serville, 1828
- Peritrichia Burmeister, 1844

For Clania Schein, 1956 see Sceloclania Schein, 1958
