= Cylindrocrates =

Scientific classification
- Kingdom: Animalia
- Phylum: Arthropoda
- Class: Insecta
- Order: Coleoptera
- Suborder: Polyphaga
- Infraorder: Scarabaeiformia
- Family: Scarabaeidae
- Subfamily: Melolonthinae
- Tribe: Hopliini
- Genus: Cylindrocrates; Schein, 1958
- Species: C. parallelus

Binomial name
- Cylindrocrates parallelus Schein, 1958

Genus of beetles

Cylindrocrates is a genus of beetle of the family Scarabaeidae. It is monotypic, being represented by the single species, Cylindrocrates parallelus, which is found in South Africa (Northern Cape).

== Description ==
Adults reach a length of about 5.5 mm (0.22 in). They are black, but the base colour of the posterior half of the pronotum is reddish-brown. There is fine, light brown scaling on the back of the head, the anterior third of the pronotum and its posterior margin, the scutellum and the elytra. There are orange-red scales on the pygidial area and dense white scales on the remaining surface of the abdomen, as well as white hairs on the sides of the thorax.
