= Minutoplia villiersi =

Scientific classification
- Kingdom: Animalia
- Phylum: Arthropoda
- Class: Insecta
- Order: Coleoptera
- Suborder: Polyphaga
- Infraorder: Scarabaeiformia
- Family: Scarabaeidae
- Genus: Minutoplia
- Species: M. villiersi

Binomial name
- Minutoplia villiersi Lacroix, 1998

Species of beetle

Minutoplia villiersi is a species of beetle of the family Scarabaeidae. It is found in Madagascar.

== Description ==
Adults reach a length of about 5 mm (0.20 in). They have light brown elytra, while the rest of the body is dark brown.
