= Blanchardoplia sabatinellii =

Scientific classification
- Kingdom: Animalia
- Phylum: Arthropoda
- Class: Insecta
- Order: Coleoptera
- Suborder: Polyphaga
- Infraorder: Scarabaeiformia
- Family: Scarabaeidae
- Genus: Blanchardoplia
- Species: B. sabatinellii

Binomial name
- Blanchardoplia sabatinellii Lacroix, 1998

Species of beetle

Blanchardoplia sabatinellii is a species of beetle of the family Scarabaeidae. It is found in Madagascar.

== Description ==
Adults reach a length of about 4–5 mm (0.16–0.20 in). They have a rather elongated body. The upper surface is dark brown with abundant and evenly distributed hairs and with light brown elytra with fine hairs.

== Etymology ==
The species is named in honour of Italian entomologist G. Sabatinelli.
