= Gymnoloma =

Scientific classification
- Kingdom: Animalia
- Phylum: Arthropoda
- Class: Insecta
- Order: Coleoptera
- Suborder: Polyphaga
- Infraorder: Scarabaeiformia
- Family: Scarabaeidae
- Subfamily: Melolonthinae
- Tribe: Hopliini
- Genus: Gymnoloma; Dejean, 1833

Genus of leaf beetles

Gymnoloma is a genus of beetles belonging to the family Scarabaeidae.

== Species ==
- Gymnoloma atomaria (Fabricius, 1781)
- Gymnoloma femorata Burmeister, 1844
- Gymnoloma nigra Dombrow, 2001
- Gymnoloma parvula (Burmeister, 1844)
- Gymnoloma perplexa Péringuey, 1902
- Gymnoloma pickeri Dombrow, 2002
- Gymnoloma pusilla Péringuey, 1902
- Gymnoloma rubra Dombrow, 2001
- Gymnoloma spuria Péringuey, 1902
- Gymnoloma subsulcata Burmeister, 1844
- Gymnoloma suturalis Burmeister, 1844
- Gymnoloma tibialis Péringuey, 1902
