= Perabula =

Scientific classification
- Kingdom: Animalia
- Phylum: Arthropoda
- Class: Insecta
- Order: Coleoptera
- Suborder: Polyphaga
- Infraorder: Scarabaeiformia
- Family: Scarabaeidae
- Subfamily: Melolonthinae
- Tribe: Hopliini
- Genus: Perabula; Allsopp & Schoolmeesters, 2024

Synonyms
- Rabula Péringuey, 1902

Genus beetles

Perabula is a genus of beetles belonging to the family Scarabaeidae.

== Species ==
- Perabula marqueza (Péringuey, 1902)
- Perabula morosa (Péringuey, 1902)
