= Laceratoplia =

Scientific classification
- Kingdom: Animalia
- Phylum: Arthropoda
- Class: Insecta
- Order: Coleoptera
- Suborder: Polyphaga
- Infraorder: Scarabaeiformia
- Family: Scarabaeidae
- Subfamily: Melolonthinae
- Tribe: Hopliini
- Genus: Laceratoplia; Lacroix, 1997
- Species: L. lepidota

Binomial name
- Laceratoplia lepidota Lacroix, 1997

Genus of beetles

Laceratoplia is a genus of beetle of the family Scarabaeidae. It is monotypic, being represented by the single species, Laceratoplia lepidota, which is found in Madagascar.

== Description ==
Adults reach a length of about 10–12 mm (0.39–0.47 in). They have an oval-shaped body. The upper surface has dense orange-yellow, scales.
