= Thabina =

Scientific classification
- Kingdom: Animalia
- Phylum: Arthropoda
- Class: Insecta
- Order: Coleoptera
- Suborder: Polyphaga
- Infraorder: Scarabaeiformia
- Family: Scarabaeidae
- Subfamily: Melolonthinae
- Tribe: Hopliini
- Genus: Thabina; Péringuey, 1902
- Species: T. simplex

Binomial name
- Thabina simplex Péringuey, 1902

Genus of beetles

Thabina is a genus of beetle of the family Scarabaeidae. It is monotypic, being represented by the single species, Thabina simplex, which is found in South Africa (Gauteng, North West).

== Description ==
Adults reach a length of about 5 mm (0.20 in). They are black, with the head rugose and with some very short, sub-flavescent hairs in the frontal part. The pronotum is broadly and deeply punctured, each puncture bearing a long, somewhat fulvous bristle, and in the furrow as well as along the outer margin are some whitish, appressed squamose hairs. The elytra are somewhat bi-costulate on each side and have along the suture a broad band of partly erect squamose white hairs, and a discoidal one not quite as broad as the juxta-sutural, and sometimes reduced to a faint line, they are deeply but not closely punctured, each puncture bearing a long bristle. The pygidial part and abdomen are clothed with appressed greyish squamose hairs, which are not dense on the pygidium. The legs are bristly and pubescent.
