= Kareiga =

Scientific classification
- Kingdom: Animalia
- Phylum: Arthropoda
- Class: Insecta
- Order: Coleoptera
- Suborder: Polyphaga
- Infraorder: Scarabaeiformia
- Family: Scarabaeidae
- Subfamily: Melolonthinae
- Tribe: Hopliini
- Genus: Kareiga; Péringuey, 1902
- Species: K. hypocrita

Binomial name
- Kareiga hypocrita Péringuey, 1902

Genus of beetles

Kareiga is a genus of beetle of the family Scarabaeidae. It is monotypic, being represented by the single species, Kareiga hypocrita, which is found in South Africa (Eastern Cape).

== Description ==
Adults reach a length of about 14 mm (0.55 in). They are dark brown, clothed with squamiform, elongate white hairs. The antennae are flavescent, and the head is very closely granoso-punctate, each puncture bearing a short hair. The pronotum is clothed with nearly coalescing, fine, but somewhat deep punctures, and covered, but not densely, with somewhat long, white squamose hairs. The scutellum is deeply and irregularly punctured and with a few hairs and the elytra are covered with oblong punctures separated from one another by a space equal to their size and enclosing a smaller round puncture bearing an appressed white, somewhat scale-like hair. The propygidium, pygidium and abdomen have scattered hairs.
