= Rimuloplia =

Scientific classification
- Kingdom: Animalia
- Phylum: Arthropoda
- Class: Insecta
- Order: Coleoptera
- Suborder: Polyphaga
- Infraorder: Scarabaeiformia
- Family: Scarabaeidae
- Subfamily: Melolonthinae
- Tribe: Hopliini
- Genus: Rimuloplia; Lacroix, 1997
- Species: R. alluaudi

Binomial name
- Rimuloplia alluaudi Lacroix, 1997

Genus of beetles

Rimuloplia is a genus of beetle of the family Scarabaeidae. It is monotypic, being represented by the single species, Rimuloplia alluaudi, which is found in Madagascar.

== Description ==
Adults reach a length of about 9 mm (0.35 in). They have an oval body with a dark brown upper surface and fairly fine, dense scales.
