= Blanchardoplia =

Scientific classification
- Kingdom: Animalia
- Phylum: Arthropoda
- Class: Insecta
- Order: Coleoptera
- Suborder: Polyphaga
- Infraorder: Scarabaeiformia
- Family: Scarabaeidae
- Subfamily: Melolonthinae
- Tribe: Hopliini
- Genus: Blanchardoplia; Lacroix, 1998

Genus beetles

Blanchardoplia is a genus of beetles belonging to the family Scarabaeidae.

== Species ==
- Blanchardoplia fulva (Blanchard, 1850)
- Blanchardoplia hirsuta Lacroix, 1998
- Blanchardoplia hirticula Lacroix, 1998
- Blanchardoplia hispida Lacroix, 1998
- Blanchardoplia parvula Lacroix, 1998
- Blanchardoplia pusilla Lacroix, 1998
- Blanchardoplia rufa Lacroix, 1998
- Blanchardoplia sabatinellii Lacroix, 1998
