= Odontoplia =

Scientific classification
- Kingdom: Animalia
- Phylum: Arthropoda
- Class: Insecta
- Order: Coleoptera
- Suborder: Polyphaga
- Infraorder: Scarabaeiformia
- Family: Scarabaeidae
- Subfamily: Melolonthinae
- Tribe: Hopliini
- Genus: Odontoplia; Fairmaire, 1897
- Species: O. alluaudi

Binomial name
- Odontoplia alluaudi Fairmaire, 1897

Genus of beetles

Odontoplia is a genus of beetle of the family Scarabaeidae. It is monotypic, being represented by the single species, Odontoplia alluaudi, which is found in Madagascar.

== Description ==
Adults reach a length of about 9–12 mm (0.35–0.47 in). They have an elongated body and elongated legs, with a bright yellow, scaly upper surface.
