= Dolichiomicroscelis =

Scientific classification
- Kingdom: Animalia
- Phylum: Arthropoda
- Class: Insecta
- Order: Coleoptera
- Suborder: Polyphaga
- Infraorder: Scarabaeiformia
- Family: Scarabaeidae
- Subfamily: Melolonthinae
- Tribe: Hopliini
- Genus: Dolichiomicroscelis; Dombrow, 2003

Genus of leaf beetles

Dolichiomicroscelis is a genus of beetles belonging to the family Scarabaeidae.

== Species ==
- Dolichiomicroscelis colvillei Dombrow, 2007
- Dolichiomicroscelis danielssoni Dombrow, 2007
- Dolichiomicroscelis gracilis (Péringuey, 1902)
