= Hoplocnemis =

Scientific classification
- Kingdom: Animalia
- Phylum: Arthropoda
- Class: Insecta
- Order: Coleoptera
- Suborder: Polyphaga
- Infraorder: Scarabaeiformia
- Family: Scarabaeidae
- Subfamily: Melolonthinae
- Tribe: Hopliini
- Genus: Hoplocnemis; Harold, 1869

Synonyms
- Hoploscelis Dejean, 1836 (preocc.)

Genus beetles

Hoplocnemis is a genus of beetles belonging to the family Scarabaeidae.

== Species ==
- Hoplocnemis andreaei Schein, 1959
- Hoplocnemis armata (Burmeister, 1844)
- Hoplocnemis auriventris (Burmeister, 1844)
- Hoplocnemis brevitibialis Dombrow, 2000
- Hoplocnemis crassipes (Olivier, 1789)
- Hoplocnemis fuliginosa (Burmeister, 1844)
- Hoplocnemis glenlyonensis Dombrow, 2000
- Hoplocnemis hessei Schein, 1959
- Hoplocnemis hylax (Fabricius, 1775)
- Hoplocnemis karrooana Péringuey, 1908
- Hoplocnemis klimaszewskii Dombrow, 1998
- Hoplocnemis koikoina Péringuey, 1902
- Hoplocnemis lightfooti Péringuey, 1908
- Hoplocnemis mutica (Burmeister, 1844)
- Hoplocnemis scholtzi Dombrow, 1998
- Hoplocnemis spectabilis Péringuey, 1902
- Hoplocnemis ulrichi Dombrow, 1998
