= Paroplia =

Scientific classification
- Kingdom: Animalia
- Phylum: Arthropoda
- Class: Insecta
- Order: Coleoptera
- Suborder: Polyphaga
- Infraorder: Scarabaeiformia
- Family: Scarabaeidae
- Subfamily: Melolonthinae
- Tribe: Hopliini
- Genus: Paroplia; Fairmaire, 1903
- Species: P. semivestita

Binomial name
- Paroplia semivestita Fairmaire, 1903

Genus of beetles

Paroplia is a genus of beetle of the family Scarabaeidae. It is monotypic, being represented by the single species, Paroplia semivestita, which is found in Madagascar.

== Description ==
Adults reach a length of about 6–8 mm (0.24–0.31 in). They have a short body. The forebody is dark brown with fine scaling. The elytra are lighter brown and entirely covered with pale yellow scales.
