= Denticnema =

Scientific classification
- Kingdom: Animalia
- Phylum: Arthropoda
- Class: Insecta
- Order: Coleoptera
- Suborder: Polyphaga
- Infraorder: Scarabaeiformia
- Family: Scarabaeidae
- Subfamily: Melolonthinae
- Tribe: Hopliini
- Genus: Denticnema; Schein, 1959

Genus beetles

Denticnema is a genus of beetles belonging to the family Scarabaeidae.

== Species ==
- Denticnema bidentata Dombrow, 2007
- Denticnema colvillei Dombrow, 2007
- Denticnema decemlineata Dombrow, 1997
- Denticnema morbillosa (Burmeister, 1844)
- Denticnema namaqua Dombrow, 1999
- Denticnema nikolaji Dombrow, 2007
- Denticnema squamosa (Burmeister, 1844)
- Denticnema striata (Burmeister, 1844)
- Denticnema striatula (Schein, 1959)
