= Hovachelus oberthuri =

Scientific classification
- Kingdom: Animalia
- Phylum: Arthropoda
- Class: Insecta
- Order: Coleoptera
- Suborder: Polyphaga
- Infraorder: Scarabaeiformia
- Family: Scarabaeidae
- Genus: Hovachelus
- Species: H. oberthuri

Binomial name
- Hovachelus oberthuri Fairmaire, 1897

Species of beetle

Hovachelus oberthuri is a species of beetle of the family Scarabaeidae. It is found in Madagascar.

== Description ==
Adults reach a length of about 9–15 mm (0.35–0.59 in). They have a shiny reddish-brown upper surface, which is sparsely speckled with hairs, which are however absent across the entire disc.
