= Ectinohoplia xenella =

Scientific classification
- Kingdom: Animalia
- Phylum: Arthropoda
- Clade: Pancrustacea
- Class: Insecta
- Order: Coleoptera
- Suborder: Polyphaga
- Infraorder: Scarabaeiformia
- Family: Scarabaeidae
- Genus: Ectinohoplia
- Species: E. xenella

Binomial name
- Ectinohoplia xenella Prokofiev, 2015

Species of beetle

Ectinohoplia xenella is a species of beetle of the family Scarabaeidae. It is found in Laos.

== Description ==
Adults reach a length of about 7 mm (0.28 in). They are black, with a reddish-brown tint along the margins of the elytra. The legs are reddish-brown. The upper and underside are covered with golden and brownish-golden scales and the disc of the pronotum has two dark longitudinal stripes of scales. The hairs and setae are mostly light, but partly dark on the disc of the pronotum and elytra.

== Etymology ==
The species name is derived from Greek xenos (meaning alien or strange).
