= Macroplia ruandana =

Scientific classification
- Kingdom: Animalia
- Phylum: Arthropoda
- Clade: Pancrustacea
- Class: Insecta
- Order: Coleoptera
- Suborder: Polyphaga
- Infraorder: Scarabaeiformia
- Family: Scarabaeidae
- Genus: Macroplia
- Species: M. ruandana

Binomial name
- Macroplia ruandana Brenske, 1898

Species of beetle

Macroplia ruandana is a species of beetle of the family Scarabaeidae. It is found in Burundi, the Democratic Republic of the Congo and Rwanda.

== Description ==
Adults reach a length of about 7.5–8 mm (0.30–0.31 in). The upper part of their body is covered with reddish-brown, narrow-lanceolate scales, while the lower part and underside are covered with yellow scales. The forelegs are reddish, and the hind legs are black.
