= Gymnoloma suturalis =

Scientific classification
- Kingdom: Animalia
- Phylum: Arthropoda
- Class: Insecta
- Order: Coleoptera
- Suborder: Polyphaga
- Infraorder: Scarabaeiformia
- Family: Scarabaeidae
- Genus: Gymnoloma
- Species: G. suturalis

Binomial name
- Gymnoloma suturalis Burmeister, 1844

Synonyms
- Gymnoloma ingloriosa Péringuey, 1902

Species of beetle

Gymnoloma suturalis is a species of beetle of the family Scarabaeidae. It is found in South Africa (Eastern Cape, Western Cape).

== Description ==
Adults reach a length of about 7 mm (0.28 in). They are black, with the elytra reddish brown or chocolate-brown and opaque, and with the outer and basal margins of the pronotum with a broad band of sub-flavescent scales. The elytra have a moderately broad band of scales along the suture, and a narrow line on the outer margin. The pygidial part and abdominal segments are densely clothed with yellowish-white scales leaving a conspicuously denuded space round the stemmata. The legs are reddish.
