= Dolichoplia longiqua =

Scientific classification
- Kingdom: Animalia
- Phylum: Arthropoda
- Class: Insecta
- Order: Coleoptera
- Suborder: Polyphaga
- Infraorder: Scarabaeiformia
- Family: Scarabaeidae
- Genus: Dolichoplia
- Species: D. longiqua

Binomial name
- Dolichoplia longiqua Lacroix, 1998

Species of beetle

Dolichoplia longiqua is a species of beetle of the family Scarabaeidae. It is found in Madagascar.

== Description ==
Adults reach a length of about 7–8 mm (0.28–0.31 in). The upper surface is dark brown with dense, rounded, whitish scales.
