= Nanniscus =

Scientific classification
- Kingdom: Animalia
- Phylum: Arthropoda
- Class: Insecta
- Order: Coleoptera
- Suborder: Polyphaga
- Infraorder: Scarabaeiformia
- Family: Scarabaeidae
- Subfamily: Melolonthinae
- Tribe: Hopliini
- Genus: Nanniscus; Burmeister, 1844
- Species: N. pulicarius

Binomial name
- Nanniscus pulicarius Burmeister, 1844

Genus of beetles

Nanniscus is a genus of beetle of the family Scarabaeidae. It is monotypic, being represented by the single species, Nanniscus pulicarius, which is found in South Africa (Cape).

== Description ==
Adults reach a length of about 3 mm (0.12 in). They are black, with the elytra testaceous and the legs rufescent. The head and pronotum are rugulose, covered with an appressed greyish pubescence and without a trace of scales. The scutellum and elytra are covered thickly with thick, appressed, somewhat squamose greyish white hairs with a slight sheen, and which, although thick, do not hide the colour of the background. The pygidial part and abdomen are densely scaly, with the scales white and smaller and rounder on the pygidium. The legs are moderately pubescent.
