= Phillsoppia rufipes =

Scientific classification
- Kingdom: Animalia
- Phylum: Arthropoda
- Clade: Pancrustacea
- Class: Insecta
- Order: Coleoptera
- Suborder: Polyphaga
- Infraorder: Scarabaeiformia
- Family: Scarabaeidae
- Genus: Phillsoppia
- Species: P. rufipes

Binomial name
- Phillsoppia rufipes (Dombrow, 2001)

Synonyms
- Leptocnemis rufipes Dombrow, 2001

Species of beetle

Phillsoppia rufipes is a species of beetle of the family Scarabaeidae. It is found in South Africa (Western Cape).
