= Caesariatoplia =

Scientific classification
- Kingdom: Animalia
- Phylum: Arthropoda
- Class: Insecta
- Order: Coleoptera
- Suborder: Polyphaga
- Infraorder: Scarabaeiformia
- Family: Scarabaeidae
- Subfamily: Melolonthinae
- Tribe: Hopliini
- Genus: Caesariatoplia; Lacroix, 1998
- Species: C. humbloti

Binomial name
- Caesariatoplia humbloti Lacroix, 1998

Genus of beetles

Caesariatoplia is a genus of beetle of the family Scarabaeidae. It is monotypic, being represented by the single species, Caesariatoplia humbloti, which is found in Madagascar.

== Description ==
Adults reach a length of about 8–9 mm (0.31–0.35 in). They have an oval body. The upper surface is reddish-brown with abundant whitish scaling.
