= Gymnoloma femorata =

Scientific classification
- Kingdom: Animalia
- Phylum: Arthropoda
- Class: Insecta
- Order: Coleoptera
- Suborder: Polyphaga
- Infraorder: Scarabaeiformia
- Family: Scarabaeidae
- Genus: Gymnoloma
- Species: G. femorata

Binomial name
- Gymnoloma femorata Burmeister, 1844

Species of beetle

Gymnoloma femorata is a species of beetle of the family Scarabaeidae. It is found in South Africa (Western Cape, Northern Cape, Eastern Cape).

== Description ==
Adults reach a length of about 7–7.25 mm (0.276–0.285 in). They are black, with the antennae piceous red and with a black club. The head and pronotum are closely scabroso-punctate, the head clothed with stiff, short, black setae. The pronotum is covered with dense, long, black bristly hairs, sulcate longitudinally in the middle, with the furrow filled with greyish-white scales not very closely set, but more numerous along the outer margin. The scutellum is scaly and the elytra are clothed with a very short, slightly greyish pubescence, not dense enough to conceal the somewhat shagreened background, and having along the suture a partly obliterated series of remote ovate white scales, a few of which are also sprinkled on the posterior part of the disk. Each elytron has two costules that disappear past the median part. In females, the sutural band of white scales is much more distinct, and there is a similar one along the outer margin. The propygidium, pygidium and underside are covered with closely set scales, which are white in males and flavescent in females.
