= Sceloclania coeruleovittata =

Scientific classification
- Kingdom: Animalia
- Phylum: Arthropoda
- Class: Insecta
- Order: Coleoptera
- Suborder: Polyphaga
- Infraorder: Scarabaeiformia
- Family: Scarabaeidae
- Genus: Sceloclania
- Species: S. coeruleovittata

Binomial name
- Sceloclania coeruleovittata (Schein, 1956)

Synonyms
- Clania coeruleovittata Schein, 1956

Species of beetle

Sceloclania coeruleovittata is a species of beetle of the family Scarabaeidae. It is found in South Africa (Western Cape).

== Description ==
Adults reach a length of about 9.5–10 mm (0.37–0.39 in). The upper surface is deep black in males and blackish-brown in females. There are three bands of blue scales on the pronotum, and as well one blue longitudinal band next to the suture and lateral margin of the elytra. The propygidium, pygidium, underside and legs all have blue scales.
