= Euknemoplia lacroixi =

Scientific classification
- Kingdom: Animalia
- Phylum: Arthropoda
- Clade: Pancrustacea
- Class: Insecta
- Order: Coleoptera
- Suborder: Polyphaga
- Infraorder: Scarabaeiformia
- Family: Scarabaeidae
- Genus: Euknemoplia
- Species: E. lacroixi

Binomial name
- Euknemoplia lacroixi Montreuil, 2012

Species of beetle

Euknemoplia lacroixi is a species of beetle of the family Scarabaeidae. It is found in Madagascar.

== Description ==
Adults reach a length of about 5–6 mm (0.20–0.24 in). They are brownish-black, with the legs and antennae reddish-brown (although the antennal club is slightly darker). Most of the upper surface is covered with dark brownish scaly setae, but there are also white scales forming longitudinal lines.

== Etymology ==
The species is named in honour of French Coleopterist Marc Lacroix.
