= Comoramorphochelus =

Scientific classification
- Kingdom: Animalia
- Phylum: Arthropoda
- Class: Insecta
- Order: Coleoptera
- Suborder: Polyphaga
- Infraorder: Scarabaeiformia
- Family: Scarabaeidae
- Subfamily: Melolonthinae
- Tribe: Hopliini
- Genus: Comoramorphochelus; Lacroix, 1997
- Species: C. comorianus

Binomial name
- Comoramorphochelus comorianus (Sabatinelli, 1992)

Synonyms
- Hoplia comoriana Sabatinelli, 1992

Genus of beetles

Comoramorphochelus is a genus of beetle of the family Scarabaeidae. It is monotypic, being represented by the single species, Comoramorphochelus comorianus, which is found on the Comoros.

== Description ==
Adults reach a length of about 6–8.5 mm (0.24–0.33 in). The upper surface is dark brown to reddish with fine scaly hairs, but with denser tufts of more pronounced scaling on the elytra.
