= Calliferoplia angulopicta =

Scientific classification
- Kingdom: Animalia
- Phylum: Arthropoda
- Class: Insecta
- Order: Coleoptera
- Suborder: Polyphaga
- Infraorder: Scarabaeiformia
- Family: Scarabaeidae
- Genus: Calliferoplia
- Species: C. angulopicta

Binomial name
- Calliferoplia angulopicta (Fairmaire, 1897)

Synonyms
- Hoplia angulopicta Fairmaire, 1897; Hoplia stigmatica Fairmaire, 1903

Species of beetle

Calliferoplia angulopicta is a species of beetle of the family Scarabaeidae. It is found in Madagascar.

== Description ==
Adults reach a length of about 6–7 mm (0.24–0.28 in). The upper surface is dark brown with dense, yellowish and brown scaly hairs.
