= Hoplocnemis karrooana =

Scientific classification
- Kingdom: Animalia
- Phylum: Arthropoda
- Class: Insecta
- Order: Coleoptera
- Suborder: Polyphaga
- Infraorder: Scarabaeiformia
- Family: Scarabaeidae
- Genus: Hoplocnemis
- Species: H. karrooana

Binomial name
- Hoplocnemis karrooana Péringuey, 1908

Species of beetle

Hoplocnemis karrooana is a species of beetle of the family Scarabaeidae. It is found in South Africa (Western Cape, Eastern Cape).

== Description ==
Adults reach a length of about 9–13 mm (0.35–0.51 in) for males and 9–10 mm (0.35–0.39 in) for females. They are black with the elytra chestnut-red or dark red. The propygidmm and abdomen are clothed with dense yellow scales. The pronotum is covered with equi-distant, deep punctures which are somewhat crowded, and the hairs of the margins are black. The elytra are numerously punctate, each puncture with a short black hair. The pygidium punctulate and very briefly hairy.
