= Dolichoplia prolata =

Scientific classification
- Kingdom: Animalia
- Phylum: Arthropoda
- Class: Insecta
- Order: Coleoptera
- Suborder: Polyphaga
- Infraorder: Scarabaeiformia
- Family: Scarabaeidae
- Genus: Dolichoplia
- Species: D. prolata

Binomial name
- Dolichoplia prolata Lacroix, 1998

Species of beetle

Dolichoplia prolata is a species of beetle of the family Scarabaeidae. It is found in Madagascar.

== Description ==
Adults reach a length of about 6–8 mm (0.24–0.31 in). They have a slightly elongated body. The upper surface is reddish-brown with dense, rounded, yellow scales.
