= Minutoplia =

Scientific classification
- Kingdom: Animalia
- Phylum: Arthropoda
- Class: Insecta
- Order: Coleoptera
- Suborder: Polyphaga
- Infraorder: Scarabaeiformia
- Family: Scarabaeidae
- Subfamily: Melolonthinae
- Tribe: Hopliini
- Genus: Minutoplia; Lacroix, 1998

Genus beetles

Minutoplia is a genus of beetles belonging to the family Scarabaeidae.

== Species ==
- Minutoplia antongilensis Lacroix, 1998
- Minutoplia villiersi Lacroix, 1998
