= Ceratochelus cyanometallicus =

Scientific classification
- Kingdom: Animalia
- Phylum: Arthropoda
- Clade: Pancrustacea
- Class: Insecta
- Order: Coleoptera
- Suborder: Polyphaga
- Infraorder: Scarabaeiformia
- Family: Scarabaeidae
- Genus: Ceratochelus
- Species: C. cyanometallicus

Binomial name
- Ceratochelus cyanometallicus Dombrow, 2002

Species of beetle

Ceratochelus cyanometallicus is a species of beetle of the family Scarabaeidae. It is found in South Africa (Mpumalanga).
