= Blanchardoplia rufa =

Scientific classification
- Kingdom: Animalia
- Phylum: Arthropoda
- Class: Insecta
- Order: Coleoptera
- Suborder: Polyphaga
- Infraorder: Scarabaeiformia
- Family: Scarabaeidae
- Genus: Blanchardoplia
- Species: B. rufa

Binomial name
- Blanchardoplia rufa Lacroix, 1998

Species of beetle

Blanchardoplia rufa is a species of beetle of the family Scarabaeidae. It is found in Madagascar.

== Description ==
Adults reach a length of about 5 mm (0.20 in). The upper surface is dark reddish-brown with fine, evenly distributed hairs.
