= Pseudoparoplia =

Scientific classification
- Kingdom: Animalia
- Phylum: Arthropoda
- Class: Insecta
- Order: Coleoptera
- Suborder: Polyphaga
- Infraorder: Scarabaeiformia
- Family: Scarabaeidae
- Subfamily: Melolonthinae
- Tribe: Hopliini
- Genus: Pseudoparoplia; Lacroix, 1997
- Species: P. perinetensis

Binomial name
- Pseudoparoplia perinetensis Lacroix, 1997

Genus of beetles

Pseudoparoplia is a genus of beetle of the family Scarabaeidae. It is monotypic, being represented by the single species, Pseudoparoplia perinetensis, which is found in Madagascar.

== Description ==
Adults reach a length of about 6.5 mm (0.26 in). They have an elongated, rather narrow body. The forebody is dark brown and the elytra are light brown. The entire upper surface is uniformly covered with scales.
