= Ceratochelus elangatulus =

Scientific classification
- Kingdom: Animalia
- Phylum: Arthropoda
- Class: Insecta
- Order: Coleoptera
- Suborder: Polyphaga
- Infraorder: Scarabaeiformia
- Family: Scarabaeidae
- Genus: Ceratochelus
- Species: C. elangatulus

Binomial name
- Ceratochelus elangatulus (Blanchard, 1850)

Synonyms
- Gymnoloma elegantula Blanchard, 1850; Monochelus elegantulus

Species of beetle

Ceratochelus elangatulus is a species of beetle of the family Scarabaeidae. It is found in South Africa (KwaZulu-Natal, Free State, Gauteng, Mpumalanga, Limpopo).

== Description ==
Adults reach a length of about 7.5–9 mm (0.30–0.35 in). They are black, with the elytra chalybeate and shining, and the antennae and legs red. The pronotum is partly covered with yellowish, elongate scales, which are denser and smaller along the base, where they form a band, somewhat irregularly disposed on the disk, but partly filling the median longitudinal groove. The scutellum is covered with small scales and the elytra have very elongate whitish scales that are not closely set but very numerous and somewhat seriate. The propygidium, pygidium and abdomen have similarly elongate whitish or yellowish scales looking almost like appressed squamose hairs and are also set not very close to each other.
