= Minutoplia antongilensis =

Scientific classification
- Kingdom: Animalia
- Phylum: Arthropoda
- Clade: Pancrustacea
- Class: Insecta
- Order: Coleoptera
- Suborder: Polyphaga
- Infraorder: Scarabaeiformia
- Family: Scarabaeidae
- Genus: Minutoplia
- Species: M. antongilensis

Binomial name
- Minutoplia antongilensis Lacroix, 1998

Species of beetle

Minutoplia antongilensis is a species of beetle of the family Scarabaeidae. It is found in Madagascar.

== Description ==
Adults reach a length of about 4 mm (0.16 in). They have a unicolorous body, ranging from light to dark brown.
