= Harpina vittigera =

Scientific classification
- Kingdom: Animalia
- Phylum: Arthropoda
- Class: Insecta
- Order: Coleoptera
- Suborder: Polyphaga
- Infraorder: Scarabaeiformia
- Family: Scarabaeidae
- Subfamily: Melolonthinae
- Tribe: Hopliini
- Genus: Harpina; Burmeister, 1844
- Species: H. vittigera

Binomial name
- Harpina vittigera Burmeister, 1844

Genus of beetles

Harpina is a genus of beetle of the family Scarabaeidae. It is monotypic, being represented by the single species, Harpina vittigera, which is found in South Africa (Western Cape).

== Description ==
Adults reach a length of about 7 mm (0.28 in). They are black and moderately shining. The head is very closely scabroso-punctate and the pronotum has deep scattered punctures each bearing a stiff erect cilia, and among these are spread a few greyish appressed hairs. The elytra have on each side two distinct costae and four bands of appressed, squamose, greyish-white hairs, in the first three intervals there is a line of single hairs, but between the third band and the supra-marginal one the hairs are more numerous. The pygidium, abdomen, and legs have similar appressed whitish hairs.
