= Gymnoloma parvula =

Scientific classification
- Kingdom: Animalia
- Phylum: Arthropoda
- Class: Insecta
- Order: Coleoptera
- Suborder: Polyphaga
- Infraorder: Scarabaeiformia
- Family: Scarabaeidae
- Genus: Gymnoloma
- Species: G. parvula

Binomial name
- Gymnoloma parvula (Burmeister, 1844)

Synonyms
- Monochelus parvulus Burmeister, 1844

Species of beetle

Gymnoloma parvula is a species of beetle of the family Scarabaeidae. It is found in South Africa (Eastern Cape).

== Description ==
Adults reach a length of about 5 mm (0.20 in). They are black, and covered with elongate white scales, looking more like squamose hairs in females. In males, the pronotum has a longitudinal denuded median space divided by a thin line of scales set in the shallow median groove. The scales on the elytra are moderately dense and more closely set along the sutural part. The head is densely scaly.
