= Megistoplia impensa =

Scientific classification
- Kingdom: Animalia
- Phylum: Arthropoda
- Class: Insecta
- Order: Coleoptera
- Suborder: Polyphaga
- Infraorder: Scarabaeiformia
- Family: Scarabaeidae
- Genus: Megistoplia
- Species: M. impensa

Binomial name
- Megistoplia impensa Lacroix, 1997

Species of beetle

Megistoplia impensa is a species of beetle of the family Scarabaeidae. It is found in Madagascar.

== Description ==
Adults reach a length of about 11.5 mm (0.45 in). They have a massive body. The upper surface is reddish-brown with fine, sparse hairs.
