= Hoplocnemis hylax =

Scientific classification
- Kingdom: Animalia
- Phylum: Arthropoda
- Class: Insecta
- Order: Coleoptera
- Suborder: Polyphaga
- Infraorder: Scarabaeiformia
- Family: Scarabaeidae
- Genus: Hoplocnemis
- Species: H. hylax

Binomial name
- Hoplocnemis hylax (Fabricius, 1775)

Synonyms
- Scarabaeus hylax Fabricius, 1775

Species of beetle

Hoplocnemis hylax is a species of beetle of the family Scarabaeidae. It is found in South Africa (Eastern Cape, Western Cape).

== Description ==
Adults reach a length of about 13–16 mm (0.51–0.63 in). Males have a piceous brown head, pronotum and legs, and the elytra are cherry red. The head is pubescent on the anterior part and fringed laterally with long, black hairs. The pronotum is glabrous on the upper side, and covered with deep, round punctures, somewhat scattered, and fringed laterally with dense, black hairs. Females are smaller than males and the punctures on the pronotum are equally deep but set close to one another.
