= Idutywa collaris =

Scientific classification
- Kingdom: Animalia
- Phylum: Arthropoda
- Class: Insecta
- Order: Coleoptera
- Suborder: Polyphaga
- Infraorder: Scarabaeiformia
- Family: Scarabaeidae
- Genus: Idutywa
- Species: I. collaris

Binomial name
- Idutywa collaris (Burmeister, 1844)

Synonyms
- Monochelus collaris Burmeister, 1844

Species of beetle

Idutywa collaris is a species of beetle of the family Scarabaeidae. It is found in South Africa (Western Cape, Northern Cape).

== Description ==
Adults reach a length of about 6–7 mm (0.24–0.28 in). Males are black, the pronotum with a broad border of ashy grey, appressed, sub-squamose hairs and a broad patch of the same in the anterior part of the disk from where it is continued in the longitudinal median groove which is deep, and in addition to these appressed hairs is clothed with a blackish erect pubescence. The head is also pubescent, but the pubescence is shorter and sub-flavescent, it is very granulose all over. The palpi and antennae, with the exception of the club, are reddish, the club however is black. The scutellum is short and clothed with squamose greyish hairs. The elytra are sinuate laterally, but attenuate towards the apex, not costulate on each side, but having there two longitudinal depressions or broad striae, one, the longer, along the suture, the other and much shorter one, on the discoidal part, these two depressions are filled with appressed squamose greyish hairs which form also a supra-marginal band reaching to the base, but the discoidal one does not reach quite to the apex. The propygidium and abdomen are clothed with squamose hairs similar to those on the elytra, but the pygidium has no scales, and is covered with a fuscous brown tomentum. Females are very similar to males, but the pygidium is clothed with greyish sub-squamiform hairs.
