= Argoplia glaberrimus =

Scientific classification
- Kingdom: Animalia
- Phylum: Arthropoda
- Class: Insecta
- Order: Coleoptera
- Suborder: Polyphaga
- Infraorder: Scarabaeiformia
- Family: Scarabaeidae
- Genus: Argoplia
- Species: A. glaberrimus

Binomial name
- Argoplia glaberrimus (Burmeister, 1844)

Synonyms
- Monochelus glaberrimus Burmeister, 1844

Species of beetle

Argoplia glaberrimus is a species of beetle of the family Scarabaeidae. It is found in South Africa (Northern Cape).

== Description ==
Adults reach a length of about 7.5–9 mm (0.30–0.35 in). They are black and very shining. There is a narrow lateral band of white scales on the pronotum, and a basal one partly obliterated except in the middle, while in the median longitudinal groove are a few white hairs. The scutellum is clothed with elongated white scales, and in the central part of the elytra, close to the suture, there is a patch of similar scales and a rudimentary longitudinal band of the same, beginning at the base but scarcely reaching to the median part. The propygidium and apical margin of the abdominal segments are fringed with white elongate scales. The antennae are reddish with the club black.
