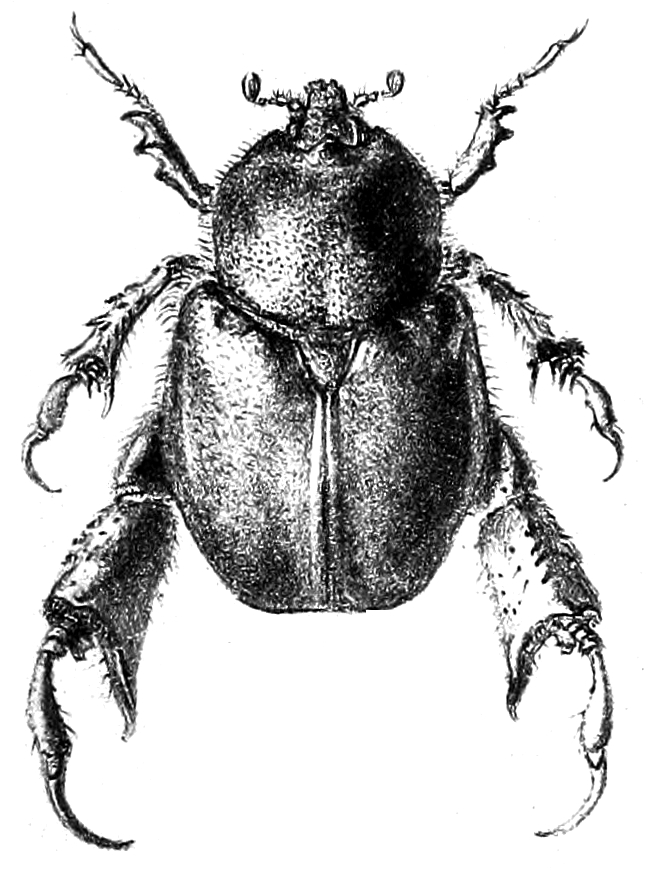

Scientific classification
- Kingdom: Animalia
- Phylum: Arthropoda
- Clade: Pancrustacea
- Class: Insecta
- Order: Coleoptera
- Suborder: Polyphaga
- Infraorder: Scarabaeiformia
- Family: Scarabaeidae
- Genus: Hoplocnemis
- Species: H. crassipes

Binomial name
- Hoplocnemis crassipes (Olivier, 1789)

Synonyms
- Scarabaeus crassipes Olivier, 1789; Trichius grossipes Schönherr, 1817

= Hoplocnemis crassipes =

Species of beetle

Hoplocnemis crassipes is a species of beetle of the family Scarabaeidae. It is found in South Africa (Western Cape).

== Description ==
Adults reach a length of about 11–13 mm (0.43–0.51 in). The head, pronotum and scutellum are black, while the elytra and legs are cherry-red. The head and clypeus are fringed with fulvous hairs and the pronotum is fringed with dense black or light fulvous hairs. The propygidium and upper sides of the abdomen are clothed with yellow scales, while the legs are clothed with black, or fulvous dense hairs.
