= Euknemoplia semisulphurea =

Scientific classification
- Kingdom: Animalia
- Phylum: Arthropoda
- Class: Insecta
- Order: Coleoptera
- Suborder: Polyphaga
- Infraorder: Scarabaeiformia
- Family: Scarabaeidae
- Genus: Euknemoplia
- Species: E. semisulphurea

Binomial name
- Euknemoplia semisulphurea (Fairmaire, 1900)

Synonyms
- Hoplia semisulphurea Fairmaire, 1900; Hoplia rufolutosa Fairmaire, 1901

Species of beetle

Euknemoplia semisulphurea is a species of beetle of the family Scarabaeidae. It is found in Madagascar.

== Description ==
Adults reach a length of about 4–6 mm (0.16–0.24 in). They have an oval body. The upper surface has dense, bright yellow, perfectly round scales.
