= Hoplocnemis auriventris =

Scientific classification
- Kingdom: Animalia
- Phylum: Arthropoda
- Class: Insecta
- Order: Coleoptera
- Suborder: Polyphaga
- Infraorder: Scarabaeiformia
- Family: Scarabaeidae
- Genus: Hoplocnemis
- Species: H. auriventris

Binomial name
- Hoplocnemis auriventris (Burmeister, 1844)

Synonyms
- Hoploscelis auriventris Burmeister, 1844

Species of beetle

Hoplocnemis auriventris is a species of beetle of the family Scarabaeidae. It is found in South Africa (Eastern Cape, Western Cape).

== Description ==
Adults reach a length of about 10–11.5 mm (0.39–0.45 in). The head, pronotum and legs are piceous black, the elytra are piceous red and the propygidium and abdominal segments are clothed with yellow scales. The head is fringed with longish black hairs.
