= List of Hoplia species =

This is a list of 300 species in the genus Hoplia, monkey beetles.

== Hoplia species ==
- Hoplia advena Brenske, 1894^{c g}
- Hoplia africana Escalera, 1914^{c g}
- Hoplia albisparsa Bates, 1887^{c g}
- Hoplia albomaculata Moser, 1912^{c g}
- Hoplia amoena Brenske, 1900^{c g}
- Hoplia anatolica Reitter, 1890^{c g}
- Hoplia angulata Reitter, 1902^{c g}
- Hoplia argentata Nonfried, 1891^{c g}
- Hoplia argentea (Poda, 1761)^{c g}
- Hoplia argenteola Moser, 1921^{c g}
- Hoplia argyritis Bates, 1887^{c g}
- Hoplia asperula Bates, 1887^{c g}
- Hoplia asteria Reitter, 1901^{c g}
- Hoplia attilioi Massa, 1979^{c g}
- Hoplia aulica (Linnaeus, 1767)^{c g}
- Hoplia aurantiaca Waterhouse, 1877^{c g}
- Hoplia aurata Waterhouse, 1877^{c g}
- Hoplia aureola (Pallas, 1781)^{c g}
- Hoplia aurifera Brenske, 1893^{c g}
- Hoplia auromicans Brenske, 1893^{c g}
- Hoplia aurotincta Fairmaire, 1888^{c g}
- Hoplia bakeri Moser, 1921^{c g}
- Hoplia bezdeki Keith, 2002^{c g}
- Hoplia bilineata (Fabricius, 1801)^{c g}
- Hoplia biplagiata Moser, 1917^{c g}
- Hoplia bisignata Gyllenhal, 1817^{c g}
- Hoplia bomiensis Zeng, 1986^{c g}
- Hoplia borneensis Moser, 1912^{c g}
- Hoplia bowringi Waterhouse, 1877^{c g}
- Hoplia bracteata Prokofiev, 2015^{c g}
- Hoplia brastagiensis Moser, 1924^{c g}
- Hoplia breviceps Moser, 1918^{c g}
- Hoplia brevipes Medvedev, 1952^{c g}
- Hoplia brevis Nonfried, 1895^{c g}
- Hoplia bruchoides Fairmaire, 1903^{c g}
- Hoplia brunnipes Bonelli, 1807^{c g}
- Hoplia bucharica Reitter, 1898^{c g}
- Hoplia caffra Burmeister, 1855^{c g}
- Hoplia callipyge LeConte, 1856^{i c g b}
- Hoplia caucasica Kolenati, 1846^{c g}
- Hoplia chinensis Endrödi, 1952^{c g}
- Hoplia chlorophana Erichson, 1848^{c g}
- Hoplia choui Miyake, 1986^{c g}
- Hoplia ciliata Castelnau, 1840^{c g}
- Hoplia cincticollis (Faldermann, 1833)^{c g}
- Hoplia cinereonebulosa Nonfried, 1895^{i c g}
- Hoplia ciscaucasica Medvedev, 1952^{c g}
- Hoplia citrea Endrödi, 1952^{c g}
- Hoplia citrinella Fairmaire, 1887^{c g}
- Hoplia clotildae Sabatinelli, 1983^{c g}
- Hoplia coerulea (Drury, 1773)^{c g}
- Hoplia coeruleosignata Moser, 1916^{c g}
- Hoplia coffeae Arrow, 1925^{c g}
- Hoplia colchica Petrovitz, 1967^{c g}
- Hoplia colini Moser, 1918^{c g}
- Hoplia coluzzi Sabatinelli, 1983^{c g}
- Hoplia communis Waterhouse, 1875^{c g}
- Hoplia concolor Sharp, 1878^{c g}
- Hoplia convexicollis Moser, 1912^{c g}
- Hoplia coralipes Reitter, 1883^{c g}
- Hoplia corniculata Reitter, 1890^{c g}
- Hoplia corporaali Moser, 1924^{c g}
- Hoplia cretacea Bates, 1887^{c g}
- Hoplia cupulosa Peyerimhoff, 1939^{c g}
- Hoplia cyanosignata Miyake, 1994^{c g}
- Hoplia cylindrica Reitter, 1903^{c g}
- Hoplia dalatella (Prokofiev, 2012)^{c g}
- Hoplia davidis Fairmaire, 1887^{c g}
- Hoplia detrita Solsky, 1876^{c g}
- Hoplia diana Sharp, 1876^{c g}
- Hoplia digitifera Peyerimhoff, 1939^{c g}
- Hoplia dilutipes Reitter, 1890^{c g}
- Hoplia dispar LeConte, 1880^{i c g b}
- Hoplia disparilis Bates, 1887^{c g}
- Hoplia dissexualis Prokofiev, 2015^{c g}
- Hoplia divina Endrödi, 1953^{c g}
- Hoplia djukini Jacobson, 1914^{c g}
- Hoplia dombrovskii Nonfried, 1895^{c g}
- Hoplia dubia (Rossi, 1790)^{c}
- Hoplia elegantula White, 1844^{c g}
- Hoplia elongata Quedenfeldt, 1888^{c g}
- Hoplia endroedii Balthasar, 1955^{c g}
- Hoplia equina LeConte, 1880^{i c g}
- Hoplia errata Fairmaire, 1898^{c g}
- Hoplia ertli Moser, 1919^{c g}
- Hoplia euphratica Zaitzev, 1923^{c g}
- Hoplia excellens Endrödi, 1952^{c g}
- Hoplia festiva Burmeister, 1844^{c g}
- Hoplia fiorii Fracassi, 1906^{c g}
- Hoplia fissa Reitter, 1890^{g}
- Hoplia fissipes Moser, 1912^{c g}
- Hoplia flavipes Germar, 1824^{c g}
- Hoplia flavomaculata Moser, 1912^{c g}
- Hoplia floridana Fisher, 1918^{i c g}
- Hoplia forsteri Tesar, 1969^{c g}
- Hoplia freudei Tesar, 1969^{c g}
- Hoplia freyi Baraud, 1967^{c g}
- Hoplia fukiensis Endrödi, 1952^{c g}
- Hoplia fulgida Waterhouse, 1877^{c g}
- Hoplia fuliginosa Nonfried, 1894^{c g}
- Hoplia fulvipennis Moser, 1912^{c g}
- Hoplia fulvofemorata Moser, 1912^{c g}
- Hoplia fungifera Prokofiev, 2015^{c g}
- Hoplia gabonica Moser, 1918^{c g}
- Hoplia gibbicollis Arrow, 1941^{c g}
- Hoplia gilleti Hardy, 1977^{i c g}
- Hoplia golovjankoi Jacobson, 1914^{c g}
- Hoplia gracilis Endrödi, 1952^{c g}
- Hoplia graminicola (Fabricius, 1792)^{c g}
- Hoplia grisea Moser, 1912^{c g}
- Hoplia griseonebulosa Moser, 1921^{c g}
- Hoplia griseosparsa Moser, 1921^{c g}
- Hoplia griseosquamosa Moser, 1918^{c g}
- Hoplia griseovestita Moser, 1924^{c g}
- Hoplia guandaoshana Kobayashi, 2017
- Hoplia guatemalensis Bates, 1887^{c g}
- Hoplia gyirongensis Zeng, 1986^{c g}
- Hoplia hakonensis Sawada, 1938^{c g}
- Hoplia hauseri Reitter, 1904^{c g}
- Hoplia hayashii Miyake, 1986^{c g}
- Hoplia herminiana Apfelbeck, 1908^{c g}
- Hoplia heterolepis Prokofiev, 2015^{c g}
- Hoplia hirsuta Moser, 1912^{c g}
- Hoplia hirta LeConte, 1880^{i c g}
- Hoplia hirticollis Heyden, 1889^{c g}
- Hoplia hofmanni Nonfried, 1895^{c g}
- Hoplia horrida Moser, 1918^{c g}
- Hoplia huettenbacheri (Nonfried, 1891)^{c g}
- Hoplia hungarica Burmeister, 1844^{c g}
- Hoplia hyrcana Medvedev, 1952^{c g}
- Hoplia imitatrix Nonfried, 1895^{c g}
- Hoplia imparilis Moser, 1912^{c g}
- Hoplia indica Moser, 1912^{c g}
- Hoplia ingrata Fairmaire, 1888^{c g}
- Hoplia inops Bates, 1887^{c g}
- Hoplia inornata Kobayashi, 1990^{c g}
- Hoplia iridescens Zeng, 1986^{c g}
- Hoplia jacobsoni Reitter, 1903^{c g}
- Hoplia jalapana Moser, 1918^{c g}
- Hoplia javana Moser, 1912^{c g}
- Hoplia kamerunica Moser, 1918^{c g}
- Hoplia klapperichi Endrödi, 1952^{c g}
- Hoplia korbi Petrovitz, 1958^{c g}
- Hoplia koreana Moser, 1920^{c g}
- Hoplia kunzii Schmidt, 1840^{c g}
- Hoplia laconiae Petrovitz, 1958^{c g}
- Hoplia laetitiae Sabatinelli, 1983^{c g}
- Hoplia lama Endrödi, 1952^{c g}
- Hoplia langbianella Prokofiev, 2015^{c g}
- Hoplia lao Prokofiev, 2015^{c g}
- Hoplia latesutulata (Fairmaire, 1899)^{g}
- Hoplia latesuturata (Fairmaire, 1900)^{c g}
- Hoplia laticollis LeConte, 1856^{i c g b}
- Hoplia leytensis Kobayashi & Fujioka, 2014^{c g}
- Hoplia limbata LeConte, 1856^{c g}
- Hoplia lindiana Moser, 1918^{c g}
- Hoplia lineata Moser, 1921^{c g}
- Hoplia lishana Miyake, 1986^{c g}
- Hoplia lurida Moser, 1918^{c g}
- Hoplia luzonica Moser, 1924^{c g}
- Hoplia maculifera Moser, 1910^{c g}
- Hoplia magnifica Arrow, 1932^{c g}
- Hoplia mahayana Sabatinelli, 1983^{c g}
- Hoplia malaccensis Moser, 1912^{c g}
- Hoplia malaisei Arrow, 1946^{c g}
- Hoplia manowensis Moser, 1918^{c g}
- Hoplia maremmana (Leo, Liberto, Rattu & Sechi, 2010)^{c g}
- Hoplia mausonensis Moser, 1921^{c g}
- Hoplia medana Moser, 1912^{c g}
- Hoplia mediocris Fairmaire, 1887^{c g}
- Hoplia meridiana ^{g}
- Hoplia messapia ^{g}
- Hoplia mexicana Harold, 1869^{c g}
- Hoplia mina Jacobson, 1914^{c g}
- Hoplia mindoroensis Kobayashi & Fujioka, 2014^{c g}
- Hoplia minuscula Fairmaire, 1889^{c g}
- Hoplia minuta (Panzer, 1789)^{c g}
- Hoplia modesta Haldeman, 1843^{i c g b}
- Hoplia moerens Waterhouse, 1875^{c g}
- Hoplia montana Moser, 1921^{c g}
- Hoplia moultoni Moser, 1912^{c g}
- Hoplia mucorea (Germar, 1824)^{i c g b}
- Hoplia mulleri Nonfried, 1895^{c g}
- Hoplia nakanei Miyake, 1986^{c g}
- Hoplia nebulosa Fairmaire, 1889^{c g}
- Hoplia negrosensis Kobayashi & Fujioka, 2014^{c g}
- Hoplia nengkaoshana Miyake, 1986^{c g}
- Hoplia nepalensis Tesar, 1969^{c g}
- Hoplia nhatrangella Prokofiev, 2015^{c g}
- Hoplia niasana Moser, 1912^{c g}
- Hoplia nigrina Reitter, 1885^{c g}
- Hoplia nigromaculata Moser, 1912^{c g}
- Hoplia nigrosetosa Miyake, 1994^{c g}
- Hoplia nigrosparsa Moser, 1921^{c g}
- Hoplia nitidipunctata Arrow, 1941^{c g}
- Hoplia oblonga Gyllenhal, 1817^{c g}
- Hoplia ochracea Burmeister, 1844^{c g}
- Hoplia ochraceoscutellata Moser, 1921^{c g}
- Hoplia ochreata Fairmaire, 1889^{c g}
- Hoplia opalescens Fairmaire, 1893^{c g}
- Hoplia paganettii Müller, 1907^{c g}
- Hoplia parvula Krynicky, 1832^{c g}
- Hoplia paupera Krynicky, 1832^{c g}
- Hoplia pentheri Ganglbauer, 1906^{c g}
- Hoplia peroni Blanchard, 1850^{c g}
- Hoplia philanthus (Fuessly, 1775)^{c g}
- Hoplia philippinensis Moser, 1910^{c g}
- Hoplia pilifera Desbrochers des Loges, 1869^{c g}
- Hoplia pisicolor Burmeister, 1844^{c g}
- Hoplia platyca Zeng, 1986^{c g}
- Hoplia plebeja Moser, 1921^{c g}
- Hoplia polita Bates, 1891^{c g}
- Hoplia pollinosa Krynicky, 1832^{c g}
- Hoplia pontica Petrovitz, 1967^{c g}
- Hoplia potanini Heyden, 1889^{c g}
- Hoplia prasina Arrow, 1941^{c g}
- Hoplia praticola Duftschmidt, 1805^{c g}
- Hoplia pseudophilanthus Petrovitz, 1967^{c g}
- Hoplia psilocephala Prokofiev, 2015^{c g}
- Hoplia pubicollis Küster, 1849^{c g}
- Hoplia pulchella Moser, 1912^{c g}
- Hoplia pulchra Miyake, 1986^{c g}
- Hoplia puncticollis Gebler, 1832^{c g}
- Hoplia quasiplebeja Prokofiev, 2015^{c g}
- Hoplia reinii Heyden, 1878^{c g}
- Hoplia reitteri Von Dalle Torre, 1912^{c g}
- Hoplia rossica Medvedev, 1952^{c g}
- Hoplia rotunda Bates, 1887^{c g}
- Hoplia rufocuprea Medvedev, 1952^{c g}
- Hoplia rufopicta Fairmaire, 1889^{c g}
- Hoplia rungsi Kocher, 1957^{c g}
- Hoplia rutilapta Prokofiev, 2015^{c g}
- Hoplia sabatinellii Rey, 2006^{c g}
- Hoplia sabraechatilae Sabatinelli, 1983^{c g}
- Hoplia sackenii LeConte, 1880^{i c g b}
- Hoplia salaama Brenske, 1898^{c g}
- Hoplia scheibei Balthasar, 1936^{c g}
- Hoplia scheini Endrödi, 1953^{c g}
- Hoplia schuberti Petrovitz, 1962^{c g}
- Hoplia schultheissi Nonfried, 1894^{c g}
- Hoplia scutellaris Waterhouse, 1877^{c g}
- Hoplia semenowi Heyden, 1889^{c g}
- Hoplia semicastanea Fairmaire, 1887^{c g}
- Hoplia setifera Moser, 1912^{c g}
- Hoplia setosella Brenske, 1893^{c g}
- Hoplia shibatai ^{g}
- Hoplia shimomurai Kobayashi, 1990^{c g}
- Hoplia shirakii Nomura, 1959^{c g}
- Hoplia shirozui Kobayashi, 1990^{c g}
- Hoplia sibuyana Moser, 1924^{c g}
- Hoplia signata Moser, 1912^{c g}
- Hoplia simillima Miyake, 1986^{c g}
- Hoplia simplex Sharp, 1876^{c g}
- Hoplia siningensis Frivaldszky, 1892^{c g}
- Hoplia sobrina Sharp, 1876^{c g}
- Hoplia sordida Burmeister, 1844^{c g}
- Hoplia spectabilis Medvedev, 1952^{c g}
- Hoplia squamacea White, 1844^{c g}
- Hoplia squamifera Burmeister, 1844^{c g}
- Hoplia squamiventris Burmeister, 1855^{c g}
- Hoplia stenolepis Apfelbeck, 1908^{c g}
- Hoplia striatipennis Wickham, 1914^{c g}
- Hoplia subcostata Bates, 1887^{c g}
- Hoplia sulcicollis Moser, 1912^{c g}
- Hoplia surata Bates, 1887^{c g}
- Hoplia susiana Escalera, 1913^{c g}
- Hoplia taipeiensis Kobayashi & Chou, 2008^{c g}
- Hoplia taiwana Miyake, 1986^{c g}
- Hoplia taliensis Moser, 1921^{c g}
- Hoplia tangana Moser, 1924^{c g}
- Hoplia teapensis Bates, 1887^{c g}
- Hoplia tenebrosa Nonfried, 1895^{c g}
- Hoplia tesari Sabatinelli, 1983^{c g}
- Hoplia testudinis Sabatinelli, 1997^{c g}
- Hoplia thibetana Von Dalle Torre, 1912^{c g}
- Hoplia trifasciata Say, 1825^{i c g b} (three lined hoplia)
- Hoplia trivialis Harold, 1869^{i c g b} (dark hoplia)
- Hoplia tuberculicollis Moser, 1912^{c g}
- Hoplia tuberculifera Moser, 1924^{c g}
- Hoplia uniformis Reitter, 1885^{c g}
- Hoplia usambarica Moser, 1918^{c g}
- Hoplia ushijima Kobayashi, 1990^{c g}
- Hoplia ushijimai Kobayashi, 1990^{g}
- Hoplia validipes Fairmaire, 1889^{c g}
- Hoplia variabilis Kobayashi & Fujioka, 2014^{c g}
- Hoplia ventraerata Prokofiev, 2015^{c g}
- Hoplia ventricosa Brenske, 1893^{c g}
- Hoplia versicolor Moser, 1921^{c g}
- Hoplia vestita Boheman, 1858^{c g}
- Hoplia vicina Frivaldszky, 1890^{c g}
- Hoplia vidua Moser, 1918^{c g}
- Hoplia virginioi Sabatinelli, 1983^{c g}
- Hoplia viridisignata Moser, 1912^{c g}
- Hoplia viridissima Brenske, 1894^{c g}
- Hoplia viridula Brenske, 1899^{c g}
- Hoplia vittata Nonfried, 1895^{c g}
- Hoplia walterrossii Sabatinelli, 1992^{c g}
- Hoplia waterstradti Moser, 1912^{c g}
- Hoplia zaitzevi Jacobson, 1914^{c g}
- Hoplia zaragozai Carillo-Ruiz, 2011^{c g}

Data sources: i = ITIS, c = Catalogue of Life, g = GBIF, b = Bugguide.net

== Selected former species ==
- Hoplia monticola Miyake, 1986^{c g}

== Species of unknown identity ==
A number of species figured in the atlas published by Künckel D'Herculais in 1887 are insufficiently recognizable and could represent any Malagasy Hopliini. For these reasons, the following species are to be considered incertae sedis and probably represent species described under a different name:

- Hoplia hova Künckel, 1887
- Hoplia lactea Künckel, 1887
- Hoplia striata Künckel, 1887
- Hoplia nigra Künckel, 1887
- Hoplia sinuata Künckel, 1887
- Hoplia madecassa Künckel, 1887
