= Hoplia bruchoides =

Scientific classification
- Kingdom: Animalia
- Phylum: Arthropoda
- Class: Insecta
- Order: Coleoptera
- Suborder: Polyphaga
- Infraorder: Scarabaeiformia
- Family: Scarabaeidae
- Genus: Hoplia
- Species: H. bruchoides

Binomial name
- Hoplia bruchoides Fairmaire, 1903

Species of beetle

Hoplia bruchoides is a species of beetle of the family Scarabaeidae. It is found in Madagascar.

== Description ==
Adults reach a length of about 4 mm (0.16 in).

== Taxonomy ==
In his study of Hopliini from Madagascar, Lacroix was unable to locate the specimen used for the description of the species and hence did not study it. In his original description, Fairmaire stated it is similar to Hoplia pygialis, which is currently placed in the genus Fairmairoplia. However, Fairmaire's general description does not allow for the certain classification of this taxon within Fairmairoplia.
