= Hoplia quasiplebeja =

Scientific classification
- Kingdom: Animalia
- Phylum: Arthropoda
- Clade: Pancrustacea
- Class: Insecta
- Order: Coleoptera
- Suborder: Polyphaga
- Infraorder: Scarabaeiformia
- Family: Scarabaeidae
- Genus: Hoplia
- Species: H. quasiplebeja

Binomial name
- Hoplia quasiplebeja Prokofiev, 2015

Species of beetle

Hoplia quasiplebeja is a species of beetle of the family Scarabaeidae. It is found in Vietnam.

== Description ==
Adults reach a length of about 5–6.3 mm (0.20–0.25 in). They are black to reddish-brown. The upper surface is covered with black or sometimes brownish-black and brown scales, usually without a pattern. The pygidium, underside and legs are lighter and covered with yellow-brown, brown and golden-yellow scales. All hairs and setae are light.

== Etymology ==
The species name refers to its similarity to Hoplia plebeja.
