= Hoplia caffra =

Scientific classification
- Kingdom: Animalia
- Phylum: Arthropoda
- Class: Insecta
- Order: Coleoptera
- Suborder: Polyphaga
- Infraorder: Scarabaeiformia
- Family: Scarabaeidae
- Genus: Hoplia
- Species: H. caffra

Binomial name
- Hoplia caffra Burmeister, 1844

Species of beetle

Hoplia caffra is a species of beetle of the family Scarabaeidae. It is found in South Africa (Eastern Cape).

== Description ==
Adults reach a length of about 8.5 mm (0.33 in). They are similar to Echyra morio, but much broader, black, shiny, punctate, and with a small whitish hair in each puncture. The hairs on the underside are broader and more scale-like. The antennae are small and brown. The legs are thick and strong, but not very long.
