= Echyra semissaria =

Scientific classification
- Kingdom: Animalia
- Phylum: Arthropoda
- Class: Insecta
- Order: Coleoptera
- Suborder: Polyphaga
- Infraorder: Scarabaeiformia
- Family: Scarabaeidae
- Genus: Echyra
- Species: E. semissaria

Binomial name
- Echyra semissaria Lacroix, 1997

Species of beetle

Echyra semissaria is a species of beetle of the family Scarabaeidae. It is found in Madagascar.

== Description ==
Adults reach a length of about 8–9 mm (0.31–0.35 in). They have a slightly elongated body, which is more massive than that of similar Echyra robinsoni. The upper surface is reddish-brown and densely covered with scales.
