= Echyra alternata =

Scientific classification
- Kingdom: Animalia
- Phylum: Arthropoda
- Class: Insecta
- Order: Coleoptera
- Suborder: Polyphaga
- Infraorder: Scarabaeiformia
- Family: Scarabaeidae
- Genus: Echyra
- Species: E. alternata

Binomial name
- Echyra alternata Lacroix, 1997

Species of beetle

Echyra alternata is a species of beetle of the family Scarabaeidae. It is found in Madagascar.

== Description ==
Adults reach a length of about 7–8 mm (0.28–0.31 in). They have a not very elongated body. The upper surface is reddish and is densely covered with rounded scales. The elytra have numerous erect cilia.
