= Hoplia psilocephala =

Scientific classification
- Kingdom: Animalia
- Phylum: Arthropoda
- Class: Insecta
- Order: Coleoptera
- Suborder: Polyphaga
- Infraorder: Scarabaeiformia
- Family: Scarabaeidae
- Genus: Hoplia
- Species: H. psilocephala

Binomial name
- Hoplia psilocephala Prokofiev, 2015

Species of beetle

Hoplia psilocephala is a species of beetle of the family Scarabaeidae. It is found in Vietnam.

== Description ==
Adults reach a length of about 7 mm (0.28 in). They are black and dark reddish-brown. The upper surface is covered with light-golden, dark-yellow, yellow and brownish scales. The pronotum has two longitudinal dark stripes on the disc and the elytra have an indistinct transverse band. The pygidium has light golden, yellow and yellow-brown scales and the underside and legs are covered with very light golden scales.

== Etymology ==
The species name is derived from Greek psilos (meaning hairy) and kephalon (meaning head).
