= Echyra pruinosa =

Scientific classification
- Kingdom: Animalia
- Phylum: Arthropoda
- Class: Insecta
- Order: Coleoptera
- Suborder: Polyphaga
- Infraorder: Scarabaeiformia
- Family: Scarabaeidae
- Genus: Echyra
- Species: E. pruinosa

Binomial name
- Echyra pruinosa (Fairmaire, 1903)

Synonyms
- Hoplia pruinosa Fairmaire, 1903

Species of beetle

Echyra pruinosa is a species of beetle of the family Scarabaeidae. It is found in Madagascar.

== Description ==
Adults reach a length of about 8.5 mm (0.33 in). They have an oval body. The upper surface is reddish-brown and very finely dotted with white, not very strong, rounded scales.
