= Hoplia mucorea =

Scientific classification
- Kingdom: Animalia
- Phylum: Arthropoda
- Class: Insecta
- Order: Coleoptera
- Suborder: Polyphaga
- Infraorder: Scarabaeiformia
- Family: Scarabaeidae
- Genus: Hoplia
- Species: H. mucorea

Binomial name
- Hoplia mucorea (Germar, 1824)

Synonyms
- Melolontha mucorea Germar, 1823; Hoplia meridionalis Boyer, 1940

Species of beetle

Hoplia mucorea is a species of scarab beetle in the family Scarabaeidae. It is found in North America, where it has been recorded from the United States (California, Florida, Georgia, North Carolina, South Carolina) and Mexico (Sonora).
