= Echyra rufopubens =

Scientific classification
- Kingdom: Animalia
- Phylum: Arthropoda
- Class: Insecta
- Order: Coleoptera
- Suborder: Polyphaga
- Infraorder: Scarabaeiformia
- Family: Scarabaeidae
- Genus: Echyra
- Species: E. rufopubens

Binomial name
- Echyra rufopubens (Fairmaire, 1903)

Synonyms
- Hoplia rufopubens Fairmaire, 1903; Hovachelus densevestitus Fairmaire, 1905

Species of beetle

Echyra rufopubens is a species of beetle of the family Scarabaeidae. It is found in Madagascar.

== Description ==
Adults reach a length of about 7–9 mm (0.28–0.35 in). They have a short body. The upper surface is reddish-brown and is covered with yellowish hairs forming lighter longitudinal bands.
