= Hoplia errata =

Scientific classification
- Kingdom: Animalia
- Phylum: Arthropoda
- Class: Insecta
- Order: Coleoptera
- Suborder: Polyphaga
- Infraorder: Scarabaeiformia
- Family: Scarabaeidae
- Genus: Hoplia
- Species: H. errata

Binomial name
- Hoplia errata Fairmaire, 1898

Synonyms
- Hoplia fasciculata Nonfried, 1892 (preocc.)

Species of beetle

Hoplia errata is a species of beetle of the family Scarabaeidae. It is found in Madagascar.

== Description ==
Adults reach a length of about 5 mm (0.20 in).

== Taxonomy ==
In his study of Hopliini from Madagascar, Lacroix was unable to locate the specimen used for the description of the species and hence did not study it. Therefore, it is considered of uncertain taxonomic placement.
