= Echyra setosa =

Scientific classification
- Kingdom: Animalia
- Phylum: Arthropoda
- Class: Insecta
- Order: Coleoptera
- Suborder: Polyphaga
- Infraorder: Scarabaeiformia
- Family: Scarabaeidae
- Genus: Echyra
- Species: E. setosa

Binomial name
- Echyra setosa Lacroix, 1997

Species of beetle

Echyra setosa is a species of beetle of the family Scarabaeidae. It is found in Madagascar.

== Description ==
Adults reach a length of about 6.5–7 mm (0.26–0.28 in). They have an elongated body. The upper surface is dark brown with fine hairs.
