= Echyra umbrina =

Scientific classification
- Kingdom: Animalia
- Phylum: Arthropoda
- Class: Insecta
- Order: Coleoptera
- Suborder: Polyphaga
- Infraorder: Scarabaeiformia
- Family: Scarabaeidae
- Genus: Echyra
- Species: E. umbrina

Binomial name
- Echyra umbrina (Fairmaire, 1886)

Synonyms
- Hoplia umbrina Fairmaire, 1886; Hoplia rubiginea Fairmaire, 1903

Species of beetle

Echyra umbrina is a species of beetle of the family Scarabaeidae. It is found in Madagascar.

== Description ==
Adults reach a length of about 8–10 mm (0.31–0.39 in). They have a rather elongated body. The upper surface is chocolate brown and covered with uniform, fine, yellowish-brown scales.
