= Hoplia bracteata =

Scientific classification
- Kingdom: Animalia
- Phylum: Arthropoda
- Class: Insecta
- Order: Coleoptera
- Suborder: Polyphaga
- Infraorder: Scarabaeiformia
- Family: Scarabaeidae
- Genus: Hoplia
- Species: H. bracteata

Binomial name
- Hoplia bracteata Prokofiev, 2015

Species of beetle

Hoplia bracteata is a species of beetle of the family Scarabaeidae. It is found in Vietnam.

== Description ==
Adults reach a length of about 5.5 mm (0.22 in). They are dark reddish-brown with golden, slightly shiny scales. The scales on the upper surface are darker than on the underside. The hairs are light.

== Etymology ==
The species name is derived from Latin bracteatus (meaning sprinkled with golden sparkles).
