= Hoplia laticollis =

Scientific classification
- Kingdom: Animalia
- Phylum: Arthropoda
- Clade: Pancrustacea
- Class: Insecta
- Order: Coleoptera
- Suborder: Polyphaga
- Infraorder: Scarabaeiformia
- Family: Scarabaeidae
- Genus: Hoplia
- Species: H. laticollis

Binomial name
- Hoplia laticollis LeConte, 1856

Species of beetle

Hoplia laticollis is a species of scarab beetle in the family Scarabaeidae. It is found in North America, where it has been recorded from Canada (Manitoba) and the United States (Arizona, Colorado, Iowa, Kansas, Montana, Nebraska, New Mexico, North Dakota, South Dakota, Texas, and Wyoming).

Adults are about 6–8.5 mm (0.24–0.33 in) in length and very similar in appearance to Hoplia callipyge.
