= Hoplia nhatrangella =

Scientific classification
- Kingdom: Animalia
- Phylum: Arthropoda
- Class: Insecta
- Order: Coleoptera
- Suborder: Polyphaga
- Infraorder: Scarabaeiformia
- Family: Scarabaeidae
- Genus: Hoplia
- Species: H. nhatrangella

Binomial name
- Hoplia nhatrangella Prokofiev, 2015

Species of beetle

Hoplia nhatrangella is a species of beetle of the family Scarabaeidae. It is found in Vietnam.

== Description ==
Adults reach a length of about 6 mm (0.24 in). They are dark reddish-brown, with lighter reddish-brown legs. The upper side, underside and legs are covered with dark golden scales. The pronotum and elytra additionally have brownish and black scales, forming a pattern. The setae on the pronotum and elytra are dark, while they are light on the rest of the body.

== Etymology ==
The species is named after the city of Nha Trang, near its type locality.
