= Fairmairoplia plicata =

Scientific classification
- Kingdom: Animalia
- Phylum: Arthropoda
- Class: Insecta
- Order: Coleoptera
- Suborder: Polyphaga
- Infraorder: Scarabaeiformia
- Family: Scarabaeidae
- Genus: Fairmairoplia
- Species: F. plicata

Binomial name
- Fairmairoplia plicata (Fairmaire, 1903)

Synonyms
- Hoplia plicata Fairmaire, 1903

Species of beetle

Fairmairoplia plicata is a species of beetle of the family Scarabaeidae. It is found in Madagascar.

== Description ==
Adults reach a length of about 6 mm (0.24 in). The upper surface is deep, glossy black with very fine, barely visible hairs. The punctures are fine and spaced apart.
