= Fairmairoplia compacta =

Scientific classification
- Kingdom: Animalia
- Phylum: Arthropoda
- Class: Insecta
- Order: Coleoptera
- Suborder: Polyphaga
- Infraorder: Scarabaeiformia
- Family: Scarabaeidae
- Genus: Fairmairoplia
- Species: F. compacta

Binomial name
- Fairmairoplia compacta Lacroix, 1997

Species of beetle

Fairmairoplia compacta is a species of beetle of the family Scarabaeidae. It is found in Madagascar.

== Description ==
Adults reach a length of about 5–5.5 mm (0.20–0.22 in). The upper surface is blackish-brown with dense scaly hairs.
