= Hoplia shirozui =

Scientific classification
- Kingdom: Animalia
- Phylum: Arthropoda
- Class: Insecta
- Order: Coleoptera
- Suborder: Polyphaga
- Infraorder: Scarabaeiformia
- Family: Scarabaeidae
- Genus: Hoplia
- Species: H. shirozui

Binomial name
- Hoplia shirozui Kobayashi, 1990

Species of beetle

Hoplia shirozui is a species of beetle of the family Scarabaeidae. It is found in Taiwan, where it has been recorded from the central mountain range.

== Description ==
Adults reach a length of about 6.5–7 mm (0.26–0.28 in). The elytra are reddish-brown and partly covered with pubescence and elongated scales, and also have a pattern of blueish-green to greyish-brown scales. The legs are reddish-brown, the pronotum is blackish brown and the ventral surface is black.
