= Hoplia trivialis =

Scientific classification
- Kingdom: Animalia
- Phylum: Arthropoda
- Class: Insecta
- Order: Coleoptera
- Suborder: Polyphaga
- Infraorder: Scarabaeiformia
- Family: Scarabaeidae
- Genus: Hoplia
- Species: H. trivialis

Binomial name
- Hoplia trivialis Harold, 1869

Synonyms
- Hoplia debilis LeConte, 1856

Species of beetle

Hoplia trivialis, the dark hoplia, is a species of scarab beetle in the family Scarabaeidae. It is found in North America, where it has been recorded from Alabama, Colorado, Connecticut, Georgia, Illinois, Indiana, Iowa, Kentucky, Maryland, Massachusetts, Mississippi, New Hampshire, New Jersey, North Carolina, Pennsylvania, Rhode Island, South Carolina, Tennessee, Texas, Virginia and Wisconsin.
