= Echyra stigmatopyga =

Scientific classification
- Kingdom: Animalia
- Phylum: Arthropoda
- Class: Insecta
- Order: Coleoptera
- Suborder: Polyphaga
- Infraorder: Scarabaeiformia
- Family: Scarabaeidae
- Genus: Echyra
- Species: E. stigmatopyga

Binomial name
- Echyra stigmatopyga (Fairmaire, 1901)

Synonyms
- Hoplia stigmatopyga Fairmaire, 1901

Species of beetle

Echyra stigmatopyga is a species of beetle of the family Scarabaeidae. It is found in Madagascar.

== Description ==
Adults reach a length of about 7 mm (0.28 in). They have a slightly elongated body. The upper surface is brownish-black. The pygidium has fine oval scales and the scales of the pronotum and elytra are oval and elongated.
