= Fairmairoplia furfurosa =

Scientific classification
- Kingdom: Animalia
- Phylum: Arthropoda
- Class: Insecta
- Order: Coleoptera
- Suborder: Polyphaga
- Infraorder: Scarabaeiformia
- Family: Scarabaeidae
- Genus: Fairmairoplia
- Species: F. furfurosa

Binomial name
- Fairmairoplia furfurosa Lacroix, 1997

Species of beetle

Fairmairoplia furfurosa is a species of beetle of the family Scarabaeidae. It is found in Madagascar.

== Description ==
Adults reach a length of about 6 mm (0.24 in). The upper surface is dull reddish-brown with abundant hair.
