= Hoplia taipeiensis =

Scientific classification
- Kingdom: Animalia
- Phylum: Arthropoda
- Class: Insecta
- Order: Coleoptera
- Suborder: Polyphaga
- Infraorder: Scarabaeiformia
- Family: Scarabaeidae
- Genus: Hoplia
- Species: H. taipeiensis

Binomial name
- Hoplia taipeiensis Kobayashi & Chou, 2008

Species of beetle

Hoplia taipeiensis is a species of beetle of the family Scarabaeidae. It is found in northern Taiwan.

== Description ==
Adults reach a length of about 6–6.5 mm (0.24–0.26 in). The dorsal surface is black with a yellowish pattern in males and without a pattern in females. The ventral surface, pygidium and propygidium are covered with golden yellowish scales. The sides and posterior areas of the pronotum, as well as the area near the elytral suture are covered with pale yellowish scales.
