= Hoplia taiwana =

Scientific classification
- Kingdom: Animalia
- Phylum: Arthropoda
- Class: Insecta
- Order: Coleoptera
- Suborder: Polyphaga
- Infraorder: Scarabaeiformia
- Family: Scarabaeidae
- Genus: Hoplia
- Species: H. taiwana

Binomial name
- Hoplia taiwana Miyake, 1986

Species of beetle

Hoplia taiwana is a species of beetle of the family Scarabaeidae. It is found in Taiwan.

== Description ==
Adults reach a length of about 5–7.5 mm (0.20–0.30 in). The dorsal surface is covered with greyish-green to brown scales. The elytra either has dark markings or is uniform in colour.
