= Hoplia dissexualis =

Scientific classification
- Kingdom: Animalia
- Phylum: Arthropoda
- Class: Insecta
- Order: Coleoptera
- Suborder: Polyphaga
- Infraorder: Scarabaeiformia
- Family: Scarabaeidae
- Genus: Hoplia
- Species: H. dissexualis

Binomial name
- Hoplia dissexualis Prokofiev, 2015

Species of beetle

Hoplia dissexualis is a species of beetle of the family Scarabaeidae. It is found in Vietnam.

== Description ==
Adults reach a length of about 4–5 mm (0.16–0.20 in). They are reddish-brown. The upper surface of the males is covered with pearly-white and/or light to golden-yellow scales, mixed with dark golden, orange-, chestnut-, and dark brown, and sometimes black scales forming a pattern. In females, this pattern is usually absent. The pygidium, underside and legs are covered with pearly yellow, golden, and yellowish-brown scales. The hairs are light.

== Etymology ==
The species name is derived from Latin dis- and sexualis (meaning of different sexes) and refers to the sexual differences characteristic of the species.
