= Hoplia griseonebulosa =

Scientific classification
- Kingdom: Animalia
- Phylum: Arthropoda
- Clade: Pancrustacea
- Class: Insecta
- Order: Coleoptera
- Suborder: Polyphaga
- Infraorder: Scarabaeiformia
- Family: Scarabaeidae
- Genus: Hoplia
- Species: H. griseonebulosa

Binomial name
- Hoplia griseonebulosa Moser, 1921

Species of beetle

Hoplia griseonebulosa is a species of beetle of the family Scarabaeidae. It is found in Vietnam.

== Description ==
Adults reach a length of about 6.5–7 mm (0.26–0.28 in). They are reddish-brown. The pygidium, underside and legs are covered with golden-yellow and yellow-brown scales. The hairs and setae on the head, pygidium, underside and legs are light in both sexes.
