= Hoplia rutilapta =

Scientific classification
- Kingdom: Animalia
- Phylum: Arthropoda
- Class: Insecta
- Order: Coleoptera
- Suborder: Polyphaga
- Infraorder: Scarabaeiformia
- Family: Scarabaeidae
- Genus: Hoplia
- Species: H. rutilapta

Binomial name
- Hoplia rutilapta Prokofiev, 2015

Species of beetle

Hoplia rutilapta is a species of beetle of the family Scarabaeidae. It is found in Laos.

== Description ==
Adults reach a length of about 7–7.5 mm (0.28–0.30 in). The upper surface is covered with golden scales. There is a pattern of orange-red scales on the elytra and the scutellum is covered with reddish scales. The pygidium, underside and legs are covered with light golden scales. On the pygidium, these are sometimes interspersed with scales with a bluish tint.

== Etymology ==
The species name is derived from Latin rutilus (meaning reddish) and aptus (meaning decorated) and refers to the pattern of the elytra.
