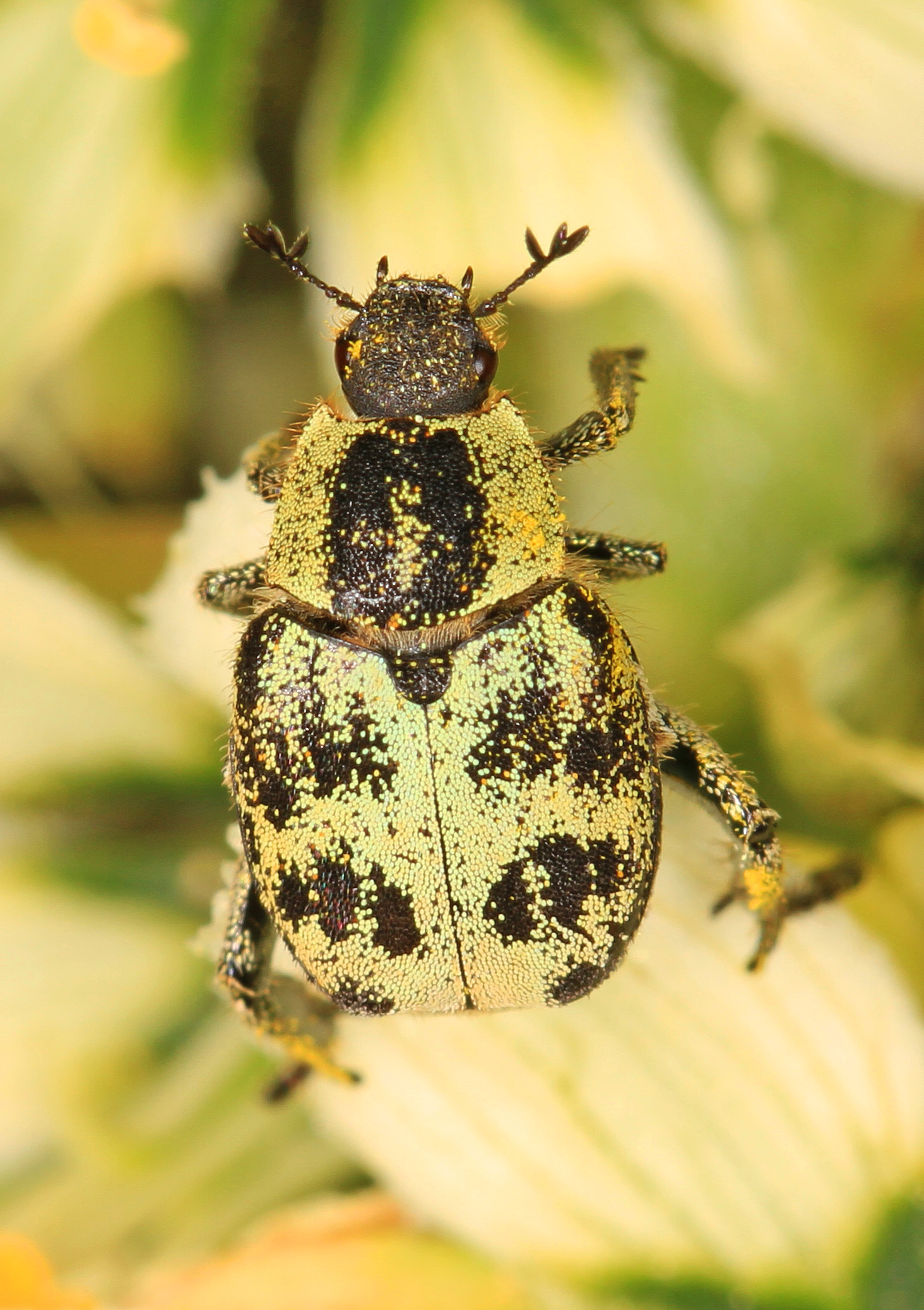

Scientific classification
- Kingdom: Animalia
- Phylum: Arthropoda
- Class: Insecta
- Order: Coleoptera
- Suborder: Polyphaga
- Infraorder: Scarabaeiformia
- Family: Scarabaeidae
- Genus: Hoplia
- Species: H. dispar

Binomial name
- Hoplia dispar LeConte, 1880

= Hoplia dispar =

Species of beetle

Hoplia dispar is a species of scarab beetle in the family Scarabaeidae. It is found in North America, where it has been recorded from Arizona, California, Nevada and Oregon.

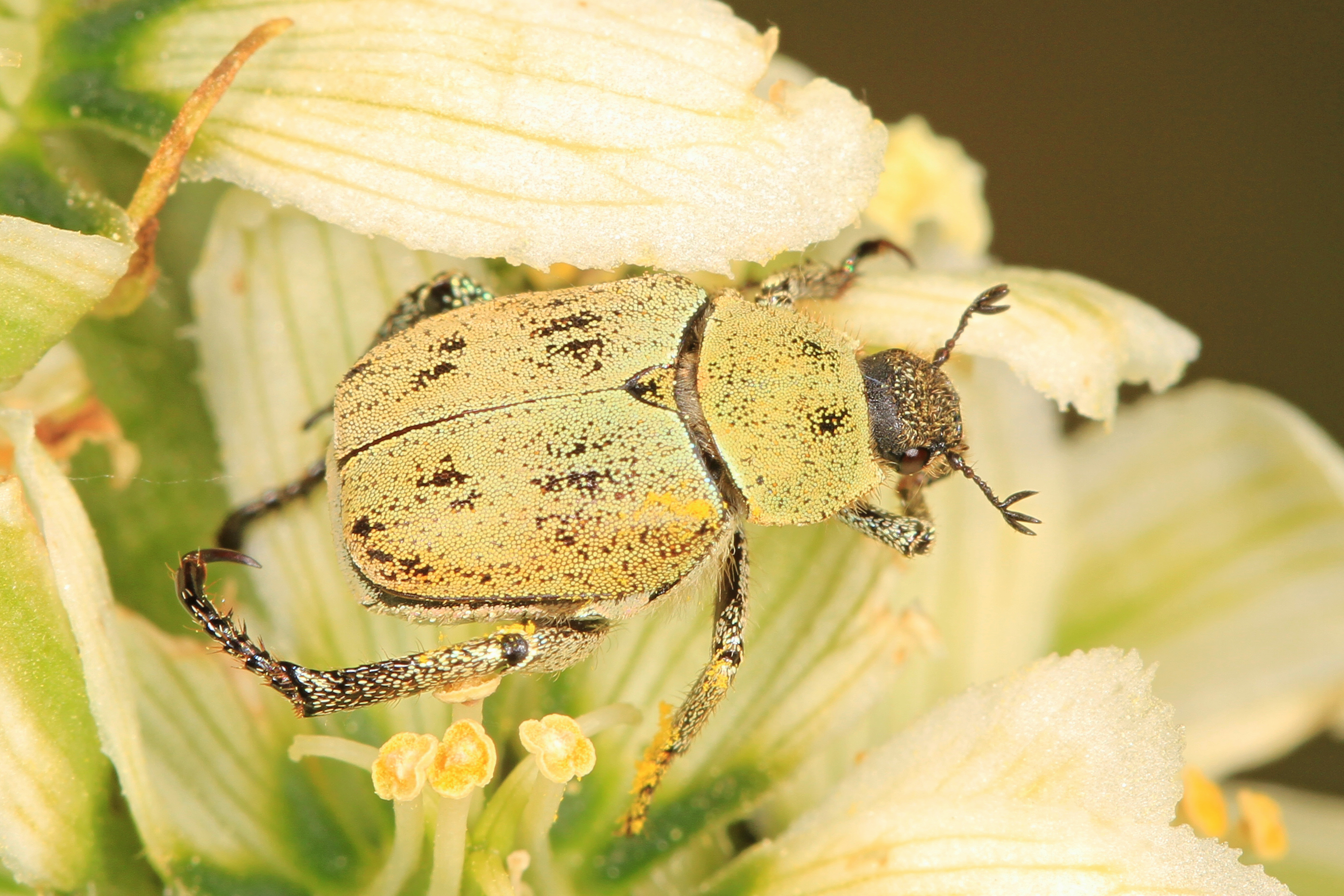
