= Hoplia ciliata =

Scientific classification
- Kingdom: Animalia
- Phylum: Arthropoda
- Class: Insecta
- Order: Coleoptera
- Suborder: Polyphaga
- Infraorder: Scarabaeiformia
- Family: Scarabaeidae
- Genus: Hoplia
- Species: H. ciliata

Binomial name
- Hoplia ciliata Laporte, 1840

Species of beetle

Hoplia ciliata is a species of beetle of the family Scarabaeidae. It is found in South Africa (Western Cape).

== Description ==
Adults reach a length of about 6 mm (0.24 in). They are black, the pronotum with very short yellow hairs arranged along the sides and forming in the centre a longitudinal line, on each side of the pronotum are long brownish cilia. The elytra are brown, and have scattered short whitish-yellow hairs. The scutellum and sides of the abdomen are yellowish, and the legs are brown (although the hind legs are black).
