= Hoplia ushijimai =

Scientific classification
- Kingdom: Animalia
- Phylum: Arthropoda
- Class: Insecta
- Order: Coleoptera
- Suborder: Polyphaga
- Infraorder: Scarabaeiformia
- Family: Scarabaeidae
- Genus: Hoplia
- Species: H. ushijimai

Binomial name
- Hoplia ushijimai Kobayashi, 1990

Species of beetle

Hoplia ushijimai is a species of beetle of the family Scarabaeidae. It is found in Taiwan.

== Description ==
Adults reach a length of about 5.5–6 mm (0.22–0.24 in). The dorsal surface is yellowish-green or greyish-green to brown, with small dark markings and covered with yellowish green scales.
