= Hoplia nakanei =

Scientific classification
- Kingdom: Animalia
- Phylum: Arthropoda
- Class: Insecta
- Order: Coleoptera
- Suborder: Polyphaga
- Infraorder: Scarabaeiformia
- Family: Scarabaeidae
- Genus: Hoplia
- Species: H. nakanei

Binomial name
- Hoplia nakanei Miyake, 1986

Species of beetle

Hoplia nakanei is a species of beetle of the family Scarabaeidae. It is found in Taiwan.

== Description ==
Adults reach a length of about 7–8.5 mm (0.28–0.33 in). The pronotum has some short setae and a longitudinal light brown pattern at the middle. The elytra have a pair of oval, mottled, dark markings. The ventral surface and pygidium are covered with golden yellow scales.
