= Hoplia sordida =

Scientific classification
- Kingdom: Animalia
- Phylum: Arthropoda
- Class: Insecta
- Order: Coleoptera
- Suborder: Polyphaga
- Infraorder: Scarabaeiformia
- Family: Scarabaeidae
- Genus: Hoplia
- Species: H. sordida

Binomial name
- Hoplia sordida Burmeister, 1844

Species of beetle

Hoplia sordida is a species of beetle of the family Scarabaeidae. It is found in South Africa (Eastern Cape, KwaZulu-Natal, Mpumalanga).

== Description ==
Adults reach a length of about 6.5–8 mm (0.26–0.31 in). They are chestnut-brown, with the upper side partly covered with whitish scales in males, and completely in the females with flavescent ones. The underside and legs have silvery, white scales in both sexes. Males have a scaly head and the pronotum has five bands of ovate, non-carinate white scales, the two lateral ones of which do somewhat commingle, and spatuliform, short, erect and distant hairs. The scutellum is scaly and the elytra have a humeral and median basal callus on each side and an apical median one, they are not costate, but there is a longitudinal impression between the two basal calluses, and they are partly covered with somewhat closely set ovate white scales, from among which spring spatuliform erect black hairs which here and there form irregular fascicles, especially in the median part of the disk. Females are similar to males, but a little more massive and entirely covered on the upper side with carinate scales, which are more elongate on the head and pronotum than on the elytra where they are ovate. The elytra are also more plainly bi-costulate, and they have regular rows of distant spatuliform hairs with occasionally short fascicles as in males.
