= Hoplia modesta =

Scientific classification
- Kingdom: Animalia
- Phylum: Arthropoda
- Class: Insecta
- Order: Coleoptera
- Suborder: Polyphaga
- Infraorder: Scarabaeiformia
- Family: Scarabaeidae
- Genus: Hoplia
- Species: H. modesta

Binomial name
- Hoplia modesta Haldeman, 1843

Synonyms
- Hoplia barbata Blatchley, 1910; Hoplia helvola Melsheimer, 1845; Hoplia monticola Melsheimer, 1845; Hoplia singularis Burmeister, 1844

Species of beetle

Hoplia modesta is a species of scarab beetle in the family Scarabaeidae. It is found in North America, where it has been recorded from Canada (Ontario) and the United States (Connecticut, Delaware, Georgia, Illinois, Indiana, Iowa, Maine, Maryland, Massachusetts, Michigan, Minnesota, New Hampshire, New Jersey, New York, North Carolina, North Dakota, Ohio, Pennsylvania, Rhode Island, South Carolina, Tennessee, Vermont, Virginia, Washington D.C., Wisconsin).
