= Echyra perroti =

Scientific classification
- Kingdom: Animalia
- Phylum: Arthropoda
- Class: Insecta
- Order: Coleoptera
- Suborder: Polyphaga
- Infraorder: Scarabaeiformia
- Family: Scarabaeidae
- Genus: Echyra
- Species: E. perroti

Binomial name
- Echyra perroti Lacroix, 1997

Species of beetle

Echyra perroti is a species of beetle of the family Scarabaeidae. It is found in Madagascar.

== Description ==
Adults reach a length of about 7–7.5 mm (0.28–0.30 in). They have a short, oval body. The upper surface is fairly light reddish-brown. The pygidium has strong, rounded scales and the pronotum and elytra also have rounded scales.
