= Hoplia shimomurai =

Scientific classification
- Kingdom: Animalia
- Phylum: Arthropoda
- Class: Insecta
- Order: Coleoptera
- Suborder: Polyphaga
- Infraorder: Scarabaeiformia
- Family: Scarabaeidae
- Genus: Hoplia
- Species: H. shimomurai

Binomial name
- Hoplia shimomurai Kobayashi, 1990

Species of beetle

Hoplia shimomurai is a species of beetle of the family Scarabaeidae. It is found in Taiwan, where it has been recorded from the northern mountain range.

== Description ==
Adults reach a length of about 7.5–10.5 mm (0.30–0.41 in). The dorsal surface is covered with yellowish-green or greyish-green scales (in males) and greyish-green to dark greyish-green scales (in females). The pronotum has some long setae and often also a pattern of small brown to dark brown scales. The ventral surface is covered with metallic yellowish-green scales.
