= Hoplia langbianella =

Scientific classification
- Kingdom: Animalia
- Phylum: Arthropoda
- Clade: Pancrustacea
- Class: Insecta
- Order: Coleoptera
- Suborder: Polyphaga
- Infraorder: Scarabaeiformia
- Family: Scarabaeidae
- Genus: Hoplia
- Species: H. langbianella

Binomial name
- Hoplia langbianella Prokofiev, 2015

Species of beetle

Hoplia langbianella is a species of beetle of the family Scarabaeidae. It is found in Vietnam.

== Description ==
Adults reach a length of about 5–6.3 mm (0.20–0.25 in). They are reddish-brown, with a blackish-brown head and pronotum. The upper surface is covered with golden-yellow, yellow-brown, or greyish-brown scales. The pronotum has four longitudinal dark stripes and the elytra have black scaly spots. The pygidium, underside and legs are covered with golden, yellow-brown, or greyish-yellow scales. All hairs and setae are light.

== Etymology ==
The species is named after the Đà Lạt Plateau (which is also known as the Langbian plateau), where it was first collected.
