= Echyra griveaudi =

Scientific classification
- Kingdom: Animalia
- Phylum: Arthropoda
- Class: Insecta
- Order: Coleoptera
- Suborder: Polyphaga
- Infraorder: Scarabaeiformia
- Family: Scarabaeidae
- Genus: Echyra
- Species: E. griveaudi

Binomial name
- Echyra griveaudi Lacroix, 1997

Species of beetle

Echyra griveaudi is a species of beetle of the family Scarabaeidae. It is found in Madagascar.

== Description ==
Adults reach a length of about 9 mm (0.35 in). They have a short, fairly stocky body. The upper surface is heavily covered with uniform white scales.
