= Hoplia griseosparsa =

Scientific classification
- Kingdom: Animalia
- Phylum: Arthropoda
- Clade: Pancrustacea
- Class: Insecta
- Order: Coleoptera
- Suborder: Polyphaga
- Infraorder: Scarabaeiformia
- Family: Scarabaeidae
- Genus: Hoplia
- Species: H. griseosparsa

Binomial name
- Hoplia griseosparsa Moser, 1921

Species of beetle

Hoplia griseosparsa is a species of beetle of the family Scarabaeidae. It is found in Vietnam.

== Description ==
Adults reach a length of about 5–6 mm (0.20–0.24 in). They are black and the upper surface is covered with brownish or blackish-brown scales, with a pattern of golden-yellow scales near the eyes and on the pronotum. There may be three bands of these scales on the elytra, but they may be reduced to varying degrees. The pygidium, underside and legs are covered with shiny golden scales.
