= Hoplia pulchra =

Scientific classification
- Kingdom: Animalia
- Phylum: Arthropoda
- Class: Insecta
- Order: Coleoptera
- Suborder: Polyphaga
- Infraorder: Scarabaeiformia
- Family: Scarabaeidae
- Genus: Hoplia
- Species: H. pulchra

Binomial name
- Hoplia pulchra Miyake, 1986

Species of beetle

Hoplia pulchra is a species of beetle of the family Scarabaeidae. It is found in central Taiwan.

== Description ==
Adults reach a length of about 8–8.5 mm (0.31–0.33 in). The pronotum has some short setae and the elytra have yellowish-green to greyish-green or dark greyish-brown scales, although sometimes there are no scales. The ventral surface is covered with yellowish-green or blueish-white scales.
