= Echyra squarrosa =

Scientific classification
- Kingdom: Animalia
- Phylum: Arthropoda
- Class: Insecta
- Order: Coleoptera
- Suborder: Polyphaga
- Infraorder: Scarabaeiformia
- Family: Scarabaeidae
- Genus: Echyra
- Species: E. squarrosa

Binomial name
- Echyra squarrosa (Burmeister, 1844)

Synonyms
- Hoplia squarrosa Burmeister, 1844

Species of beetle

Echyra squarrosa is a species of beetle of the family Scarabaeidae. It is found in Madagascar.

== Description ==
Adults reach a length of about 6.5–9 mm (0.26–0.35 in). They have a short, oval body. The upper surface is dark brown and is covered with glossy white scales.
