= Fairmairoplia cristata =

Scientific classification
- Kingdom: Animalia
- Phylum: Arthropoda
- Class: Insecta
- Order: Coleoptera
- Suborder: Polyphaga
- Infraorder: Scarabaeiformia
- Family: Scarabaeidae
- Genus: Fairmairoplia
- Species: F. cristata

Binomial name
- Fairmairoplia cristata Lacroix, 1997

Species of beetle

Fairmairoplia cristata is a species of beetle of the family Scarabaeidae. It is found in Madagascar.

== Description ==
Adults reach a length of about 5.5 mm (0.22 in). They have a rather elongated body. The upper surface is brown with dense squamulose hairs. The hairs on the elytra form denser longitudinal bands.
