= Echyra denisae =

Scientific classification
- Kingdom: Animalia
- Phylum: Arthropoda
- Class: Insecta
- Order: Coleoptera
- Suborder: Polyphaga
- Infraorder: Scarabaeiformia
- Family: Scarabaeidae
- Genus: Echyra
- Species: E. denisae

Binomial name
- Echyra denisae Lacroix, 1997

Species of beetle

Echyra denisae is a species of beetle of the family Scarabaeidae. It is found in Madagascar.

== Description ==
Adults reach a length of about 7–9 mm (0.28–0.35 in). They have a slightly elongated body. The upper surface is reddish-brown and is sparsely covered with scales forming spots or bands.
