= Fairmairoplia lophiodonta =

Scientific classification
- Kingdom: Animalia
- Phylum: Arthropoda
- Class: Insecta
- Order: Coleoptera
- Suborder: Polyphaga
- Infraorder: Scarabaeiformia
- Family: Scarabaeidae
- Genus: Fairmairoplia
- Species: F. lophiodonta

Binomial name
- Fairmairoplia lophiodonta Lacroix, 1997

Species of beetle

Fairmairoplia lophiodonta is a species of beetle of the family Scarabaeidae. It is found in Madagascar.

== Description ==
Adults reach a length of about 4.5–5 mm (0.18–0.20 in). They have an oval, rather elongated body. The upper surface is reddish-brown with fine, sparse hairs.
