= Echyra margaritacea =

Scientific classification
- Kingdom: Animalia
- Phylum: Arthropoda
- Class: Insecta
- Order: Coleoptera
- Suborder: Polyphaga
- Infraorder: Scarabaeiformia
- Family: Scarabaeidae
- Genus: Echyra
- Species: E. margaritacea

Binomial name
- Echyra margaritacea (Burmeister, 1844)

Synonyms
- Hoplia margaritacea Burmeister, 1844; Hoplia valida Fairmaire, 1903; Hoplia ornata Nonfried, 1891

Species of beetle

Echyra margaritacea is a species of beetle of the family Scarabaeidae. It is found in Madagascar.

== Description ==
Adults reach a length of about 7–10 mm (0.28–0.39 in). They have an elongated body. The upper surface is reddish-brown and is densely covered with whitish or ochre-yellow scales.
