= Echyra delphinensis =

Scientific classification
- Kingdom: Animalia
- Phylum: Arthropoda
- Class: Insecta
- Order: Coleoptera
- Suborder: Polyphaga
- Infraorder: Scarabaeiformia
- Family: Scarabaeidae
- Genus: Echyra
- Species: E. delphinensis

Binomial name
- Echyra delphinensis Lacroix, 1997

Species of beetle

Echyra delphinensis is a species of beetle of the family Scarabaeidae. It is found in Madagascar.

== Description ==
Adults reach a length of about 7.5–8 mm (0.30–0.31 in). They have a rather elongated body. The upper surface is dark brown with a strong bicolored covering of light yellow and brownish-orange scales.
