= Echyra marmorea =

Scientific classification
- Kingdom: Animalia
- Phylum: Arthropoda
- Class: Insecta
- Order: Coleoptera
- Suborder: Polyphaga
- Infraorder: Scarabaeiformia
- Family: Scarabaeidae
- Genus: Echyra
- Species: E. marmorea

Binomial name
- Echyra marmorea (Blanchard, 1850)

Synonyms
- Hoplia marmorea Blanchard, 1850; Hoplia atropicta Fairmaire, 1897

Species of beetle

Echyra marmorea is a species of beetle of the family Scarabaeidae. It is found in Madagascar.

== Description ==
Adults reach a length of about 10–11 mm (0.39–0.43 in). They have a rather elongated, massive body. The upper surface is reddish-brown and is not very densely covered with fine, fairly elongated scales.
