= Hoplia coeruleosignata =

Scientific classification
- Kingdom: Animalia
- Phylum: Arthropoda
- Clade: Pancrustacea
- Class: Insecta
- Order: Coleoptera
- Suborder: Polyphaga
- Infraorder: Scarabaeiformia
- Family: Scarabaeidae
- Genus: Hoplia
- Species: H. coeruleosignata

Binomial name
- Hoplia coeruleosignata Moser, 1916

Synonyms
- Hoplia schereri Tesař, 1969

Species of beetle

Hoplia coeruleosignata is a species of beetles of the family Scarabaeidae found in Bhutan, India (Jammu and Kashmir, Sikkim), and Nepal.

== Description ==
Adults reach a length around 5.5 mm. The upper surface is covered with black scales and has light blue markings. The pronotum is densely covered with black scales and has scattered, erect setae. A narrow, blue lateral band extends around the obtuse hindcorners and ends with an indistinct small mark. The scutellum is black. The elytra are densely covered with black scales and a narrow light-blue band accompanies the anterior edge and extends along the suture to the middle. A shortened blue transverse band is on both sides.
