= Hoplia inornata =

Scientific classification
- Kingdom: Animalia
- Phylum: Arthropoda
- Class: Insecta
- Order: Coleoptera
- Suborder: Polyphaga
- Infraorder: Scarabaeiformia
- Family: Scarabaeidae
- Genus: Hoplia
- Species: H. inornata

Binomial name
- Hoplia inornata Kobayashi, 1990

Species of beetle

Hoplia inornata is a species of beetle of the family Scarabaeidae. It is found in Taiwan, where it has been recorded from the central mountain range.

== Description ==
Adults reach a length of about 9–10 mm (0.35–0.39 in). They have a shining black (but sometimes reddish brown) body. The dorsal surface is sometimes almost glabrous.
