= Fairmairoplia penicillata =

Scientific classification
- Kingdom: Animalia
- Phylum: Arthropoda
- Class: Insecta
- Order: Coleoptera
- Suborder: Polyphaga
- Infraorder: Scarabaeiformia
- Family: Scarabaeidae
- Genus: Fairmairoplia
- Species: F. penicillata

Binomial name
- Fairmairoplia penicillata Lacroix, 1997

Species of beetle

Fairmairoplia penicillata is a species of beetle of the family Scarabaeidae. It is found in Madagascar.

== Description ==
Adults reach a length of about 4.5 mm (0.18 in). They have a short body. The upper surface is dark brown with the pronotum blackish and with thick, scaly and fairly dense hairs.
