= Echyra grisea =

Scientific classification
- Kingdom: Animalia
- Phylum: Arthropoda
- Class: Insecta
- Order: Coleoptera
- Suborder: Polyphaga
- Infraorder: Scarabaeiformia
- Family: Scarabaeidae
- Genus: Echyra
- Species: E. grisea

Binomial name
- Echyra grisea Lacroix, 1997

Species of beetle

Echyra grisea is a species of beetle of the family Scarabaeidae. It is found in Madagascar.

== Description ==
Adults reach a length of about 9 mm (0.35 in). They have a rather elongated body. The upper surface is dark brown and is covered with elongated scales.
