= Fairmairoplia scitula =

Scientific classification
- Kingdom: Animalia
- Phylum: Arthropoda
- Class: Insecta
- Order: Coleoptera
- Suborder: Polyphaga
- Infraorder: Scarabaeiformia
- Family: Scarabaeidae
- Genus: Fairmairoplia
- Species: F. scitula

Binomial name
- Fairmairoplia scitula Lacroix, 1997

Species of beetle

Fairmairoplia scitula is a species of beetle of the family Scarabaeidae. It is found in Madagascar.

== Description ==
Adults reach a length of about 6.5 mm (0.26 in). They have a short, oval body. The upper surface is reddish-brown with fine, regular, sparse hairs.
