= Hoplia sackenii =

Scientific classification
- Kingdom: Animalia
- Phylum: Arthropoda
- Clade: Pancrustacea
- Class: Insecta
- Order: Coleoptera
- Suborder: Polyphaga
- Infraorder: Scarabaeiformia
- Family: Scarabaeidae
- Genus: Hoplia
- Species: H. sackenii

Binomial name
- Hoplia sackenii LeConte, 1880

Species of beetle

Hoplia sackenii is a species of May beetle or junebug in the family Scarabaeidae. It is found in North America, where it has been recorded from Canada (Alberta, British Columbia) and the United States (California, Nevada, Oregon, Washington).
