= Hoplia choui =

Scientific classification
- Kingdom: Animalia
- Phylum: Arthropoda
- Class: Insecta
- Order: Coleoptera
- Suborder: Polyphaga
- Infraorder: Scarabaeiformia
- Family: Scarabaeidae
- Genus: Hoplia
- Species: H. choui

Binomial name
- Hoplia choui Miyake, 1986

Species of beetle

Hoplia choui is a species of beetle of the family Scarabaeidae. It is found in Taiwan, where it has been recorded from the northern mountain range.

== Description ==
Adults reach a length of about 7.5–8 mm (0.30–0.31 in). The pronotum has several setae along the lateral and anterior margins and sometimes some erect short setae at the sides.
