= Hoplia nengkaoshana =

Scientific classification
- Kingdom: Animalia
- Phylum: Arthropoda
- Class: Insecta
- Order: Coleoptera
- Suborder: Polyphaga
- Infraorder: Scarabaeiformia
- Family: Scarabaeidae
- Genus: Hoplia
- Species: H. nengkaoshana

Binomial name
- Hoplia nengkaoshana Miyake, 1986

Synonyms
- Hoplia monticola Miyake, 1986

Species of beetle

Hoplia nengkaoshana is a species of beetle of the family Scarabaeidae. It is found in Taiwan.

== Description ==
Adults reach a length of about 7–9 mm (0.28–0.35 in) (subspecies nengkaoshana) and about 9.5–10.5 mm (0.37–0.41 in) (subspecies alishana). The pronotum has long setae and the ventral surface is covered with silvery white (subspecies nengkaoshana) or yellowish green (subspecies alishana) scales. The elytra are dark greyish-brown with rows of setae in nengkaoshana, while the elytra of alishana have rows of sparse hairs.

== Subspecies ==
- Hoplia nengkaoshana nengkaoshana (Taiwan)
- Hoplia nengkaoshana alishana Kobayashi, 1990 (Taiwan: Alishan Range)
