= Echyra latecostata =

Scientific classification
- Kingdom: Animalia
- Phylum: Arthropoda
- Class: Insecta
- Order: Coleoptera
- Suborder: Polyphaga
- Infraorder: Scarabaeiformia
- Family: Scarabaeidae
- Genus: Echyra
- Species: E. latecostata

Binomial name
- Echyra latecostata (Fairmaire, 1901)

Synonyms
- Hoplia latecostata Fairmaire, 1901

Species of beetle

Echyra latecostata is a species of beetle of the family Scarabaeidae. It is found in Madagascar.

== Description ==
Adults reach a length of about 7–8 mm (0.28–0.31 in). They have a rather elongated body with broad elytra and rounded elytral sides. The upper surface is dark brown and densely covered with yellowish scales.
