= Hoplia ventraerata =

Scientific classification
- Kingdom: Animalia
- Phylum: Arthropoda
- Clade: Pancrustacea
- Class: Insecta
- Order: Coleoptera
- Suborder: Polyphaga
- Infraorder: Scarabaeiformia
- Family: Scarabaeidae
- Genus: Hoplia
- Species: H. ventraerata

Binomial name
- Hoplia ventraerata Prokofiev, 2015

Species of beetle

Hoplia ventraerata is a species of beetle of the family Scarabaeidae. It is found in Laos.

== Description ==
Adults reach a length of about 6.8–7 mm (0.27–0.28 in). They are black or dark reddish-brown. The upper surface is covered with dark golden and yellow-brown scales with a pattern of fulvous-brown and black scales. The pygidium, underside and legs are covered with dark, copper-red scales, mixed with larger, shiny golden scales with a bluish tint. The hairs and setae are light to dark brown on the upper surface, while those on the pygidium, underside and legs are light.

== Etymology ==
The species name is derived from Latin venter (meaning bottom or belly) and aeratus (meaning covered with copper).
