= Hoplia argenteola =

Scientific classification
- Kingdom: Animalia
- Phylum: Arthropoda
- Clade: Pancrustacea
- Class: Insecta
- Order: Coleoptera
- Suborder: Polyphaga
- Infraorder: Scarabaeiformia
- Family: Scarabaeidae
- Genus: Hoplia
- Species: H. argenteola

Binomial name
- Hoplia argenteola Moser, 1921

Species of beetle

Hoplia argenteola is a species of beetle of the family Scarabaeidae. It is found in Vietnam.

== Description ==
Adults reach a length of about 4.5–5 mm (0.18–0.20 in). They are reddish-brown. The upper and underside are covered with silvery and light golden scales, sometimes with a faint bluish tint on the abdomen. On the pronotum, these scales are interspersed with dark golden scales. The elytra have two rounded discal spots of dark golden scales.
