= Hoplia dalatella =

Scientific classification
- Kingdom: Animalia
- Phylum: Arthropoda
- Clade: Pancrustacea
- Class: Insecta
- Order: Coleoptera
- Suborder: Polyphaga
- Infraorder: Scarabaeiformia
- Family: Scarabaeidae
- Genus: Hoplia
- Species: H. dalatella

Binomial name
- Hoplia dalatella (Prokofiev, 2012)

Synonyms
- Ectinohoplia dalatella Prokofiev, 2012; Ectinohoplia dalatella nigrella Prokofiev, 2012

Species of beetle

Hoplia dalatella is a species of beetle of the family Scarabaeidae. It is found in Vietnam.

== Description ==
Adults reach a length of about 4.2–4.5 mm (0.17–0.18 in). They have greenish-golden scales and a light pattern on the upper surface.
