= Hoplia festiva =

Scientific classification
- Kingdom: Animalia
- Phylum: Arthropoda
- Class: Insecta
- Order: Coleoptera
- Suborder: Polyphaga
- Infraorder: Scarabaeiformia
- Family: Scarabaeidae
- Genus: Hoplia
- Species: H. festiva

Binomial name
- Hoplia festiva Burmeister, 1844

Species of beetle

Hoplia festiva is a species of scarab beetle in the family Scarabaeidae. It is found in Mexico (Veracruz).
