= Fairmairoplia obscura =

Scientific classification
- Kingdom: Animalia
- Phylum: Arthropoda
- Class: Insecta
- Order: Coleoptera
- Suborder: Polyphaga
- Infraorder: Scarabaeiformia
- Family: Scarabaeidae
- Genus: Fairmairoplia
- Species: F. obscura

Binomial name
- Fairmairoplia obscura Lacroix, 1997

Species of beetle

Fairmairoplia obscura is a species of beetle of the family Scarabaeidae. It is found in Madagascar.

== Description ==
Adults reach a length of about 6 mm (0.24 in). The upper surface is dark dull brown with abundant hairs, but these are finer and less dense on the elytra.
