= Hoplia lao =

Scientific classification
- Kingdom: Animalia
- Phylum: Arthropoda
- Class: Insecta
- Order: Coleoptera
- Suborder: Polyphaga
- Infraorder: Scarabaeiformia
- Family: Scarabaeidae
- Genus: Hoplia
- Species: H. lao

Binomial name
- Hoplia lao Prokofiev, 2015

Species of beetle

Hoplia lao is a species of beetle of the family Scarabaeidae. It is found in Laos.

== Description ==
Adults reach a length of about 9.5 mm (0.37 in). They are very dark reddish-brown, with a black head and scutellum. The upper side, underside and legs are covered with brownish scales. The hairs and setae are light brown, while they are blackish-brown on the elytra.

== Etymology ==
The species name refers to its country of origin.
