= Hoplia trifasciata =

Scientific classification
- Kingdom: Animalia
- Phylum: Arthropoda
- Class: Insecta
- Order: Coleoptera
- Suborder: Polyphaga
- Infraorder: Scarabaeiformia
- Family: Scarabaeidae
- Genus: Hoplia
- Species: H. trifasciata

Binomial name
- Hoplia trifasciata Say, 1825

Synonyms
- Hoplia ferrisi Boyer, 1940; Hoplia primaria Burmeister, 1844; Hoplia tristis Melsheimer, 1845

Species of beetle

Hoplia trifasciata, the three lined hoplia, is a species of scarab beetle in the family Scarabaeidae. It is found in the eastern United States and Canada.
