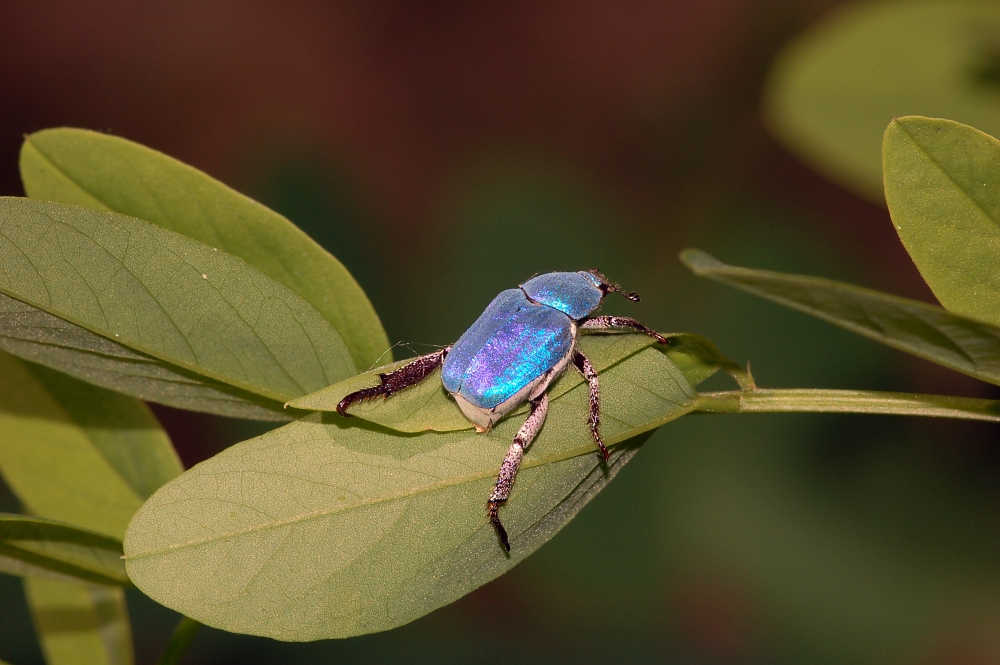

Scientific classification
- Kingdom: Animalia
- Phylum: Arthropoda
- Clade: Pancrustacea
- Class: Insecta
- Order: Coleoptera
- Suborder: Polyphaga
- Infraorder: Scarabaeiformia
- Family: Scarabaeidae
- Genus: Hoplia
- Species: H. coerulea

Binomial name
- Hoplia coerulea (Drury, 1773)

Synonyms
- Scarabaeus coeruleus Drury, 1773; Hoplia coerulea cosimii Sabatinelli, 1991; Hoplia coerulea nigricollis Bedel, 1911; Hoplia coerulea imposita Du Buysson, 1906; Hoplia formosa Latreille, 1807; Melolontha squamosa Olivier, 1789; Scarabaeus argenteus Geoffroy, 1785; Melolontha farinosa Fabricius, 1775

= Hoplia coerulea =

Species of beetle

Hoplia coerulea is a species of scarabaeid beetle belonging to the subfamily Melolonthinae. This beetle can be found in Southwest Europe, including France, Spain, and Switzerland.

Males are bright blue; females are brownish.
