= Hoplia shibatai =

Scientific classification
- Kingdom: Animalia
- Phylum: Arthropoda
- Class: Insecta
- Order: Coleoptera
- Suborder: Polyphaga
- Infraorder: Scarabaeiformia
- Family: Scarabaeidae
- Genus: Hoplia
- Species: H. shibatai

Binomial name
- Hoplia shibatai (Miyake, 1986)

Synonyms
- Pseudohoplia shibatai Miyake, 1986; Pseudohoplia shibatai makiharai Miyake, 1986; Pseudohoplia shibatai yushana Y. Miyake, 1986; Pseudohoplia shibatai matsudai Y. Miyake, 1986

Species of beetle

Hoplia shibatai is a species of beetle of the family Scarabaeidae. It is found in Taiwan.

== Description ==
Adults reach a length of about 7–10 mm (0.28–0.39 in). There are metallic blueish-green or yellowish green scales on the dorsal surface and the legs are yellowish reddish-brown. The ventral surface is covered with metallic greyish-white to greyish-green scales.

== Subspecies ==
- Hoplia shibatai shibatai (central to southern region of Taiwan)
- Hoplia shibatai makiharai (Miyake, 1986) (northern mountain range of Taiwan)
