= Hoplia salaama =

Scientific classification
- Kingdom: Animalia
- Phylum: Arthropoda
- Clade: Pancrustacea
- Class: Insecta
- Order: Coleoptera
- Suborder: Polyphaga
- Infraorder: Scarabaeiformia
- Family: Scarabaeidae
- Genus: Hoplia
- Species: H. salaama

Binomial name
- Hoplia salaama Brenske, 1898

Species of beetle

Hoplia salaama is a species of beetle of the family Scarabaeidae. It is found in Tanzania.

== Description ==
Adults reach a length of about 5 mm (0.20 in). They have a small, narrow, yellowish body, with the head darker. The short, tapered, rounded clypeus is reddish-brown, and the elytra have two dark, indistinct spots in the middle, and also some elongate, even more indistinct, darker longitudinal striations along the suture and laterally. The pronotum also has a darker spot on each side. They are covered with short, appressed white hairs almost uniformly but not densely on the underside and upper side. The abdomen is black.
