= Hoplia lishana =

Scientific classification
- Kingdom: Animalia
- Phylum: Arthropoda
- Class: Insecta
- Order: Coleoptera
- Suborder: Polyphaga
- Infraorder: Scarabaeiformia
- Family: Scarabaeidae
- Genus: Hoplia
- Species: H. lishana

Binomial name
- Hoplia lishana Miyake, 1986

Species of beetle

Hoplia lishana is a species of beetle of the family Scarabaeidae. It is found in Taiwan, where it has been recorded from the northern to central mountain range.

== Description ==
Adults reach a length of about 7–9 mm (0.28–0.35 in). Males have a black dorsal with black legs, while the dorsal surface of the females is mostly reddish brown (but sometimes black to blackish brown) with reddish brown legs. The elytra have long pubescence, inconspicuous rows of setae and blue-green to yellowish green scales which form a pattern. The ventral surface is black.
