= Hoplia fungifera =

Scientific classification
- Kingdom: Animalia
- Phylum: Arthropoda
- Clade: Pancrustacea
- Class: Insecta
- Order: Coleoptera
- Suborder: Polyphaga
- Infraorder: Scarabaeiformia
- Family: Scarabaeidae
- Genus: Hoplia
- Species: H. fungifera

Binomial name
- Hoplia fungifera Prokofiev, 2015

Species of beetle

Hoplia fungifera is a species of beetle of the family Scarabaeidae. It is found in Laos.

== Description ==
Adults reach a length of about 4.5–5 mm (0.18–0.20 in). They are black. The dorsum is covered with black and brownish-black scales. There are also yellow and light-golden scales forming a pattern. The pygidium, part of the propygidium, underside and legs are covered with golden scales.

== Etymology ==
The species name is derived from Latin fungus (meaning mushroom) and fero (meaning to bear) and refers to the raised scales on the top, reminiscent of the bodies of some lower fungi.
