= Echyra nasuta =

Scientific classification
- Kingdom: Animalia
- Phylum: Arthropoda
- Class: Insecta
- Order: Coleoptera
- Suborder: Polyphaga
- Infraorder: Scarabaeiformia
- Family: Scarabaeidae
- Genus: Echyra
- Species: E. nasuta

Binomial name
- Echyra nasuta Lacroix, 1997

Species of beetle

Echyra nasuta is a species of beetle of the family Scarabaeidae. It is found in Madagascar.

== Description ==
Adults reach a length of about 8–8.5 mm (0.31–0.33 in). They have a massive, short body. The upper surface is dark reddish-brown. The pygidium has fine oval scales, while the pronotum and elytra have oval, elongated scales.
