= Hoplia heterolepis =

Scientific classification
- Kingdom: Animalia
- Phylum: Arthropoda
- Class: Insecta
- Order: Coleoptera
- Suborder: Polyphaga
- Infraorder: Scarabaeiformia
- Family: Scarabaeidae
- Genus: Hoplia
- Species: H. heterolepis

Binomial name
- Hoplia heterolepis Prokofiev, 2015

Species of beetle

Hoplia heterolepis is a species of beetle of the family Scarabaeidae. It is found in Vietnam.

== Description ==
Adults reach a length of about 5.5–6 mm (0.22–0.24 in). The colour of their body ranges from reddish-brown to black. There are reddish-brown, brownish, golden and black scales on the dorsum. The latter forming two longitudinal discal bands on the pronotum and a spot on each side of these stripes, as well as an S-shaped pattern on the elytra. The pygidium, underside and legs have golden, dull and slightly shiny scales. There are black setae on the pronotum, elytra, head, underside, legs and pygidium.

== Etymology ==
The species name is derived from Greek and means covered with various scales, referring to the uneven size of the scales on the body.
