= Echyra elegans =

Scientific classification
- Kingdom: Animalia
- Phylum: Arthropoda
- Class: Insecta
- Order: Coleoptera
- Suborder: Polyphaga
- Infraorder: Scarabaeiformia
- Family: Scarabaeidae
- Genus: Echyra
- Species: E. elegans

Binomial name
- Echyra elegans Lacroix, 1997

Species of beetle

Echyra elegans is a species of beetle of the family Scarabaeidae. It is found in Madagascar.

== Description ==
Adults reach a length of about 7–9 mm (0.28–0.35 in). They have an elongated body. The upper surface is reddish-brown. The head has dense punctation and the frons has fine, sparse scaling.
