= Hoplia hayashii =

Scientific classification
- Kingdom: Animalia
- Phylum: Arthropoda
- Class: Insecta
- Order: Coleoptera
- Suborder: Polyphaga
- Infraorder: Scarabaeiformia
- Family: Scarabaeidae
- Genus: Hoplia
- Species: H. hayashii

Binomial name
- Hoplia hayashii Miyake, 1986

Species of beetle

Hoplia hayashii is a species of beetle of the family Scarabaeidae. It is found in Taiwan.

== Description ==
Adults reach a length of about 7–9 mm (0.28–0.35 in). The ventral surface is black, while the dorsal surface and legs are black. The elytra are sometimes reddish-brown in males.
