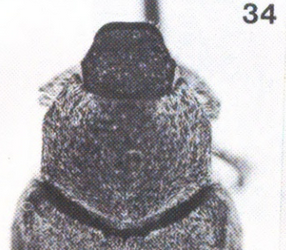
- Black and white photo of the head and prothorax of a Hoplia callipyge specimen

Scientific classification
- Kingdom: Animalia
- Phylum: Arthropoda
- Clade: Pancrustacea
- Class: Insecta
- Order: Coleoptera
- Suborder: Polyphaga
- Infraorder: Scarabaeiformia
- Family: Scarabaeidae
- Genus: Hoplia
- Species: H. callipyge

Binomial name
- Hoplia callipyge LeConte, 1856

Synonyms
- Hoplia cazieri Boyer, 1940; Hoplia convexula LeConte, 1856; Hoplia deserticola Boyer, 1940; Hoplia humboltensis Boyer, 1940; Hoplia irrorata LeConte, 1856; Hoplia lecontei Dalla Torre, 1913; Hoplia mutata Harold, 1869; Hoplia oregona LeConte, 1856; Hoplia pubicollis LeConte, 1856; Hoplia utahensis Boyer, 1940

= Hoplia callipyge =

Species of beetle

Hoplia callipyge is a species of scarab beetle in the family Scarabaeidae. It has been recorded in the Western United States, British Columbia in Canada, and Baja California in Mexico. Adults are about 5.75–10.5 mm (0.226–0.413 in) long, 3.4–5 mm (0.13–0.20 in) wide, oval, and brown. They are very similar visually to other Hoplia species, especially H. hirta and H. laticollis .

The beetles are active March through May and are noted for feeding on the petals of light-colored roses. However, they also feed on other flowers and the young leaves and fruit of certain plants. Larvae hatch from white eggs in soil and feed on roots and decaying plants.
