= Echyra =

Scientific classification
- Kingdom: Animalia
- Phylum: Arthropoda
- Class: Insecta
- Order: Coleoptera
- Suborder: Polyphaga
- Infraorder: Scarabaeiformia
- Family: Scarabaeidae
- Subfamily: Melolonthinae
- Tribe: Hopliini
- Genus: Echyra; Erichson, 1847

Genus of leaf beetles

Echyra is a genus of beetles belonging to the family Scarabaeidae.

== Species ==
- Echyra alternata Lacroix, 1997
- Echyra castanea Lacroix, 1997
- Echyra decorsei Lacroix, 1997
- Echyra delphinensis Lacroix, 1997
- Echyra denisae Lacroix, 1997
- Echyra elegans Lacroix, 1997
- Echyra elongata Lacroix, 1997
- Echyra grisea Lacroix, 1997
- Echyra griveaudi Lacroix, 1997
- Echyra latecostata (Fairmaire, 1901)
- Echyra lokobensis Lacroix, 1997
- Echyra margaritacea (Burmeister, 1844)
- Echyra marmorea (Blanchard, 1850)
- Echyra morio (Burmeister, 1844)
- Echyra nasuta Lacroix, 1997
- Echyra oberthuri Lacroix, 1997
- Echyra perrieri Lacroix, 1997
- Echyra perroti Lacroix, 1997
- Echyra pruinosa (Fairmaire, 1903)
- Echyra robinsoni Lacroix, 1997
- Echyra rufopubens (Fairmaire, 1903)
- Echyra semissaria Lacroix, 1997
- Echyra setosa Lacroix, 1997
- Echyra squarrosa (Burmeister, 1844)
- Echyra stigmatopyga (Fairmaire, 1901)
- Echyra tenuitarsis (Fairmaire, 1903)
- Echyra tsaratanensis Lacroix, 1997
- Echyra umbrina (Fairmaire, 1886)
