= Hoplia simillima =

Scientific classification
- Kingdom: Animalia
- Phylum: Arthropoda
- Class: Insecta
- Order: Coleoptera
- Suborder: Polyphaga
- Infraorder: Scarabaeiformia
- Family: Scarabaeidae
- Genus: Hoplia
- Species: H. simillima

Binomial name
- Hoplia simillima Miyake, 1986

Species of beetle

Hoplia simillima is a species of beetle of the family Scarabaeidae. It is found in Taiwan.

== Description ==
Adults reach a length of about 6.5–7.5 mm (0.26–0.30 in). The dorsal surface is black with a yellowish pattern in males and without a pattern in females. The elytra are dark reddish brown to dark brown and the colour of pronotum ranges from black to dark. The ventral surface, pygidium and propygidium are covered with bluish silvery scales.
