= Echyra elongata =

Scientific classification
- Kingdom: Animalia
- Phylum: Arthropoda
- Class: Insecta
- Order: Coleoptera
- Suborder: Polyphaga
- Infraorder: Scarabaeiformia
- Family: Scarabaeidae
- Genus: Echyra
- Species: E. elongata

Binomial name
- Echyra elongata Lacroix, 1997

Species of beetle

Echyra elongata is a species of beetle of the family Scarabaeidae. It is found in Madagascar.

== Description ==
Adults reach a length of about 9–10 mm (0.35–0.39 in). They have a rather elongated body. The upper surface is dark brown and covered with fine scales.
