= Hoplia guandaoshana =

Scientific classification
- Kingdom: Animalia
- Phylum: Arthropoda
- Class: Insecta
- Order: Coleoptera
- Suborder: Polyphaga
- Infraorder: Scarabaeiformia
- Family: Scarabaeidae
- Genus: Hoplia
- Species: H. guandaoshana

Binomial name
- Hoplia guandaoshana Kobayashi, 2017

Species of beetle

Hoplia guandaoshana is a species of beetle of the family Scarabaeidae. It is found in Taiwan.

== Description ==
Adults reach a length of about 9–10.5 mm (0.35–0.41 in). They have a black to dark blackish brown, elongate-oblong body, while the legs and antennae are light reddish brown (with a dark blackish brown club). The dorsal surface is covered with light greenish scales, while the ventral surface, propygidium and pygidium are covered with light greyish-white scales (in males) and golden yellowish scales (in females).

== Etymology ==
The species is named after the type locality, Guandaoshan, in central Taiwan.
