= Fairmairoplia =

Scientific classification
- Kingdom: Animalia
- Phylum: Arthropoda
- Class: Insecta
- Order: Coleoptera
- Suborder: Polyphaga
- Infraorder: Scarabaeiformia
- Family: Scarabaeidae
- Subfamily: Melolonthinae
- Tribe: Hopliini
- Genus: Fairmairoplia; Lacroix, 1997

Genus of leaf beetles

Fairmairoplia is a genus of beetles belonging to the family Scarabaeidae.

== Species ==
- Fairmairoplia carinata Lacroix, 1997
- Fairmairoplia compacta Lacroix, 1997
- Fairmairoplia cristata Lacroix, 1997
- Fairmairoplia cristulata Lacroix, 1997
- Fairmairoplia furfurosa Lacroix, 1997
- Fairmairoplia korystata Lacroix, 1997
- Fairmairoplia lophiodonta Lacroix, 1997
- Fairmairoplia obscura Lacroix, 1997
- Fairmairoplia penicillata Lacroix, 1997
- Fairmairoplia plicata (Fairmaire, 1903)
- Fairmairoplia pygialis (Fairmaire, 1898)
- Fairmairoplia scitula Lacroix, 1997
