= Fairmairoplia pygialis =

Scientific classification
- Kingdom: Animalia
- Phylum: Arthropoda
- Class: Insecta
- Order: Coleoptera
- Suborder: Polyphaga
- Infraorder: Scarabaeiformia
- Family: Scarabaeidae
- Genus: Fairmairoplia
- Species: F. pygialis

Binomial name
- Fairmairoplia pygialis (Fairmaire, 1898)

Synonyms
- Hoplia pygialis Fairmaire, 1898; Microplus iners Fairmaire, 1899

Species of beetle

Fairmairoplia pygialis is a species of beetle of the family Scarabaeidae. It is found in Madagascar.

== Description ==
Adults reach a length of about 5.5–6.5 mm (0.22–0.26 in). They have a rather oval body. The upper surface is brown with dense yellowish scaly hairs.
