= Echyra morio =

Scientific classification
- Kingdom: Animalia
- Phylum: Arthropoda
- Class: Insecta
- Order: Coleoptera
- Suborder: Polyphaga
- Infraorder: Scarabaeiformia
- Family: Scarabaeidae
- Genus: Echyra
- Species: E. morio

Binomial name
- Echyra morio (Burmeister, 1844)

Synonyms
- Hoplia morio Burmeister, 1844; Hoplia atronitens Fairmaire, 1901

Species of beetle

Echyra morio is a species of beetle of the family Scarabaeidae. It is found in Madagascar.

== Description ==
Adults reach a length of about 7–8 mm (0.28–0.31 in). They have a slightly elongated, entirely black body. The hairs on the upper surface are fine and uniform and the pronotum and elytra have erect, short setae.
