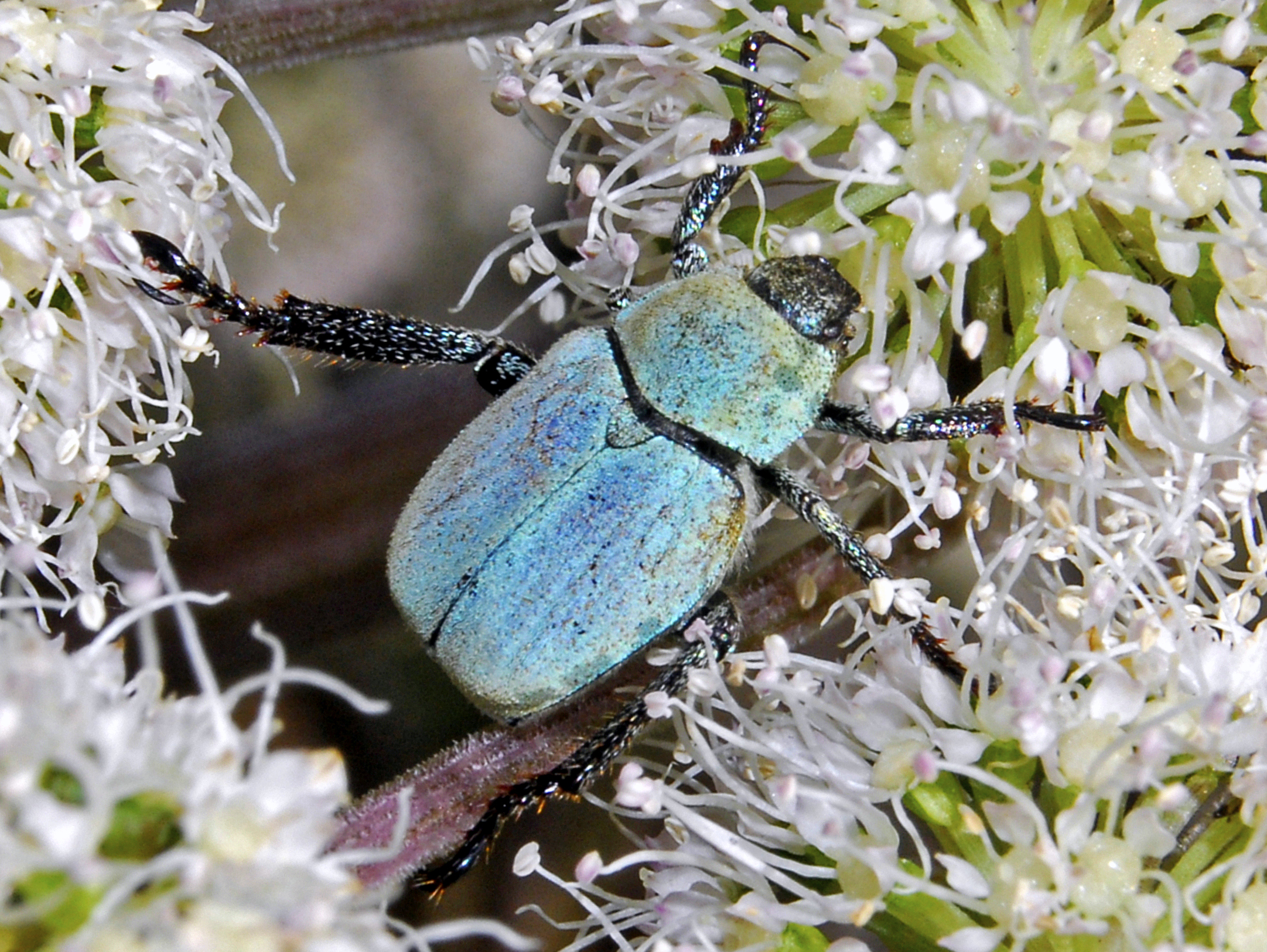

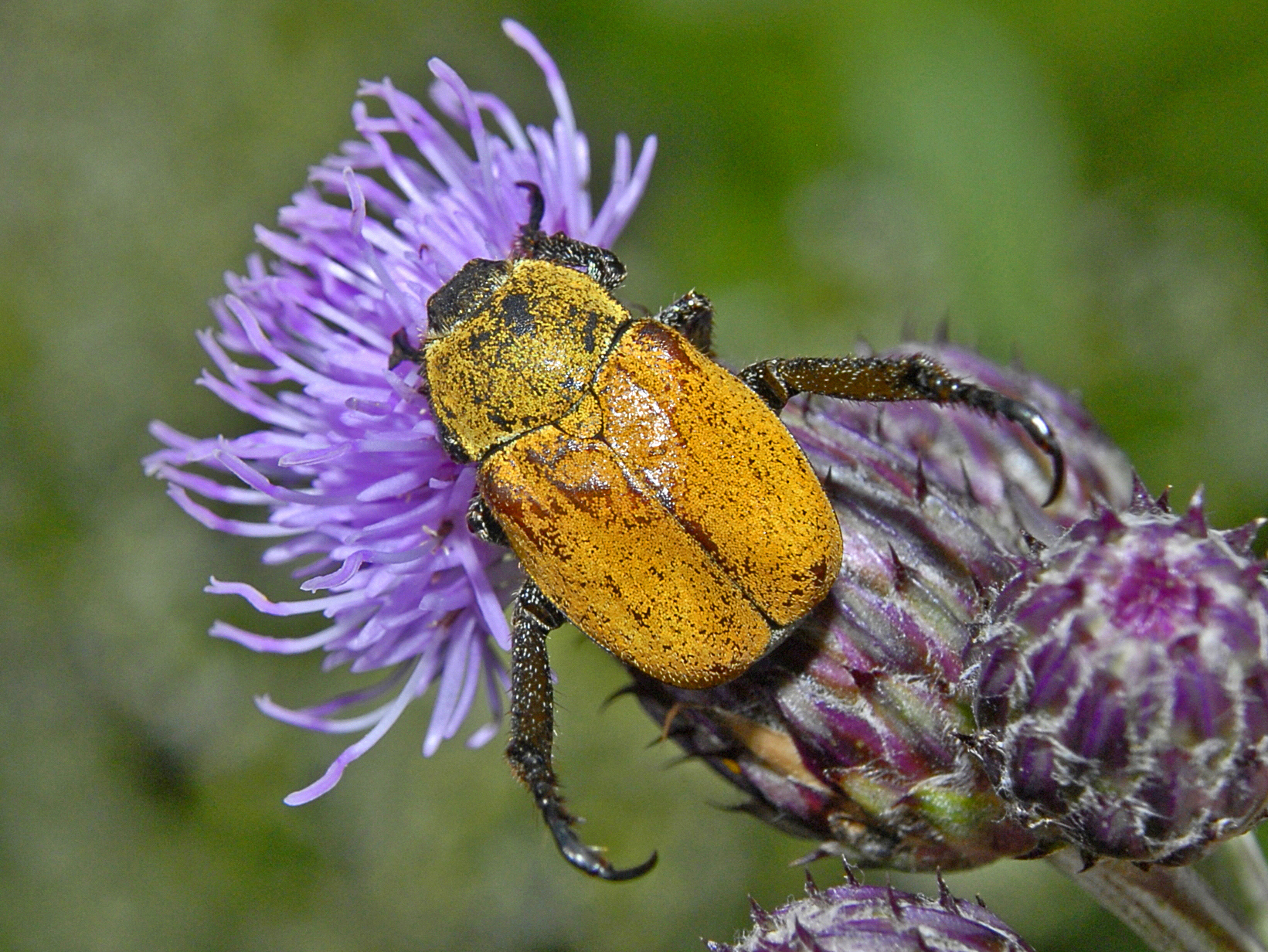
- Male (top) and female (bottom)

Scientific classification
- Kingdom: Animalia
- Phylum: Arthropoda
- Clade: Pancrustacea
- Class: Insecta
- Order: Coleoptera
- Suborder: Polyphaga
- Infraorder: Scarabaeiformia
- Family: Scarabaeidae
- Genus: Hoplia
- Species: H. argentea

Binomial name
- Hoplia argentea (Poda, 1761)

Synonyms
- Scarabaeus argenteus Poda, 1761; Hoplia karamani Reitter, 1893; Hoplia sulphurea Dufour, 1843; Hoplia argentea ambigua Mulsant, 1842; Hoplia argentea deflorata Mulsant, 1842; Hoplia argentea glauca Mulsant, 1842; Hoplia argentea micans Mulsant, 1842; Hoplia argentea rufolutea Mulsant, 1842; Hoplia argentea sedicolor Mulsant, 1842; Hoplia argentea sublutea Mulsant, 1842; Hoplia argentea viridula Mulsant, 1842; Scarabaeus farinosa Linnaeus, 1761; Hoplia farinosa; Scarabaeus farinosus Linnaeus, 1761; Hoplia farinosa aureoviridis Balthasar, 1931; Hoplia farinosa fissa Reitter, 1890; Hoplia farinosa griseola Rey, 1890

= Hoplia argentea =

Species of beetle

Hoplia argentea, the Mountain monkey beetle is a species of scarabaeid beetle belonging to the subfamily Melolonthinae. Adults are quite colourful.

== Distribution ==
These flower-loving scarabs, quite common in the mountains, are present in most of Europe (Albania, Austria, Belgium, Croatia, Czech Republic, France, Germany, Greece, Hungary, Italy, Luxembourg, Macedonia, Montenegro, Romania, Serbia, Slovakia, Slovenia, Spain, Switzerland).

== Habitat ==
These beetles inhabit open landscapes, parks, mixed forests, gardens, forest edges and meadows.

== Description ==
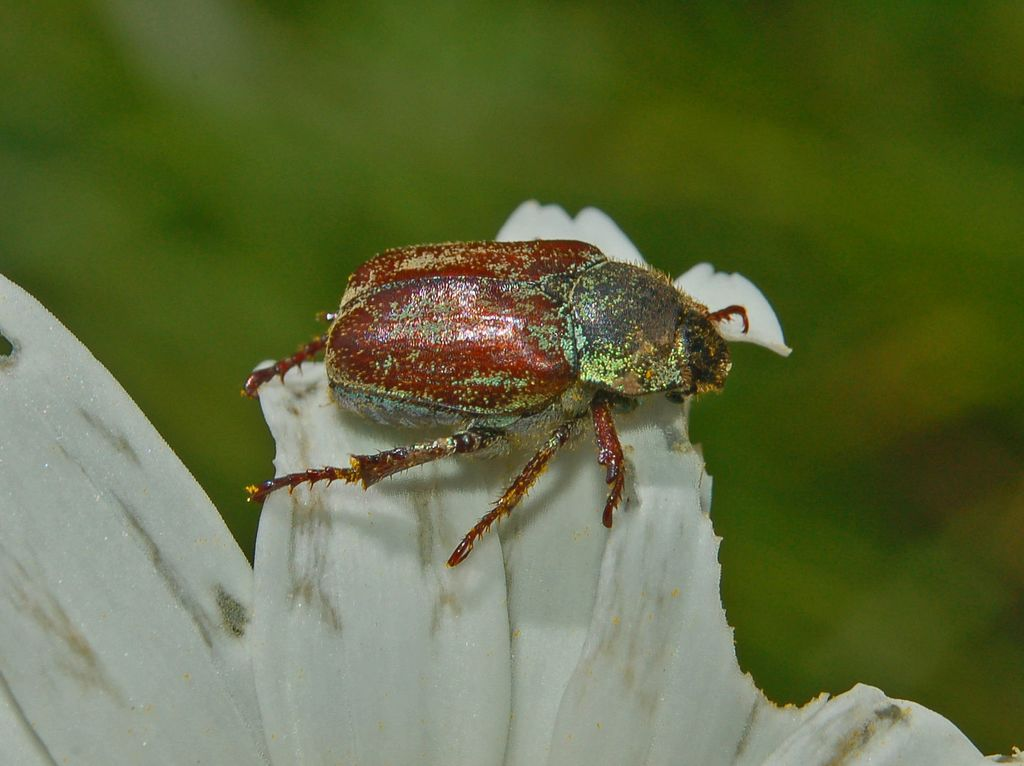
Old specimen that lost most of the scales

The adults of Hoplia argentea grow up to 9–12 millimetres (0.35–0.47 in) long. It is a very variable chromatic species. The body of these medium-sized flower-loving scarabs is covered with pale green, bluish-green or yellow ocher scales. The scales produce interference colors (as with butterflies). Old specimens lose most of the scales, changing their color from green to brown. Like other species of the genus Hoplia, it has fairly long hind legs terminated by a single nail. The legs in males are black with longer hind legs, while in the female they are reddish and the body colour is usually brown.

Hoplia argentea feeding

== Biology ==
Adults can mostly be encountered from May through September in orchards, meadows and clearings feeding on pollen of flowers, especially Apiaceae species. The larvae develop in the soil feeding on roots of various plants during the summer, then hibernate, emerging as adults in spring.
