= Hoplia plebeja =

Scientific classification
- Kingdom: Animalia
- Phylum: Arthropoda
- Clade: Pancrustacea
- Class: Insecta
- Order: Coleoptera
- Suborder: Polyphaga
- Infraorder: Scarabaeiformia
- Family: Scarabaeidae
- Genus: Hoplia
- Species: H. plebeja

Binomial name
- Hoplia plebeja Moser, 1921

Species of beetle

Hoplia plebeja is a species of beetle of the family Scarabaeidae. It is found in China (Yunnan) and Laos.

== Description ==
Adults reach a length of about 6–6.5 mm (0.24–0.26 in). They are reddish-brown, with the top of the head black. The upper surface is covered with brown, yellowish-brown, and blackish-brown scales and there are two pairs of dark spots on the disc of the elytra, as well as a pair of longitudinal dark stripes on the disc of the pronotum. The pygidium, underside and legs are paler and covered with greyish-brown, yellowish-brown, and golden-yellow scales. All hairs and setae are light.
