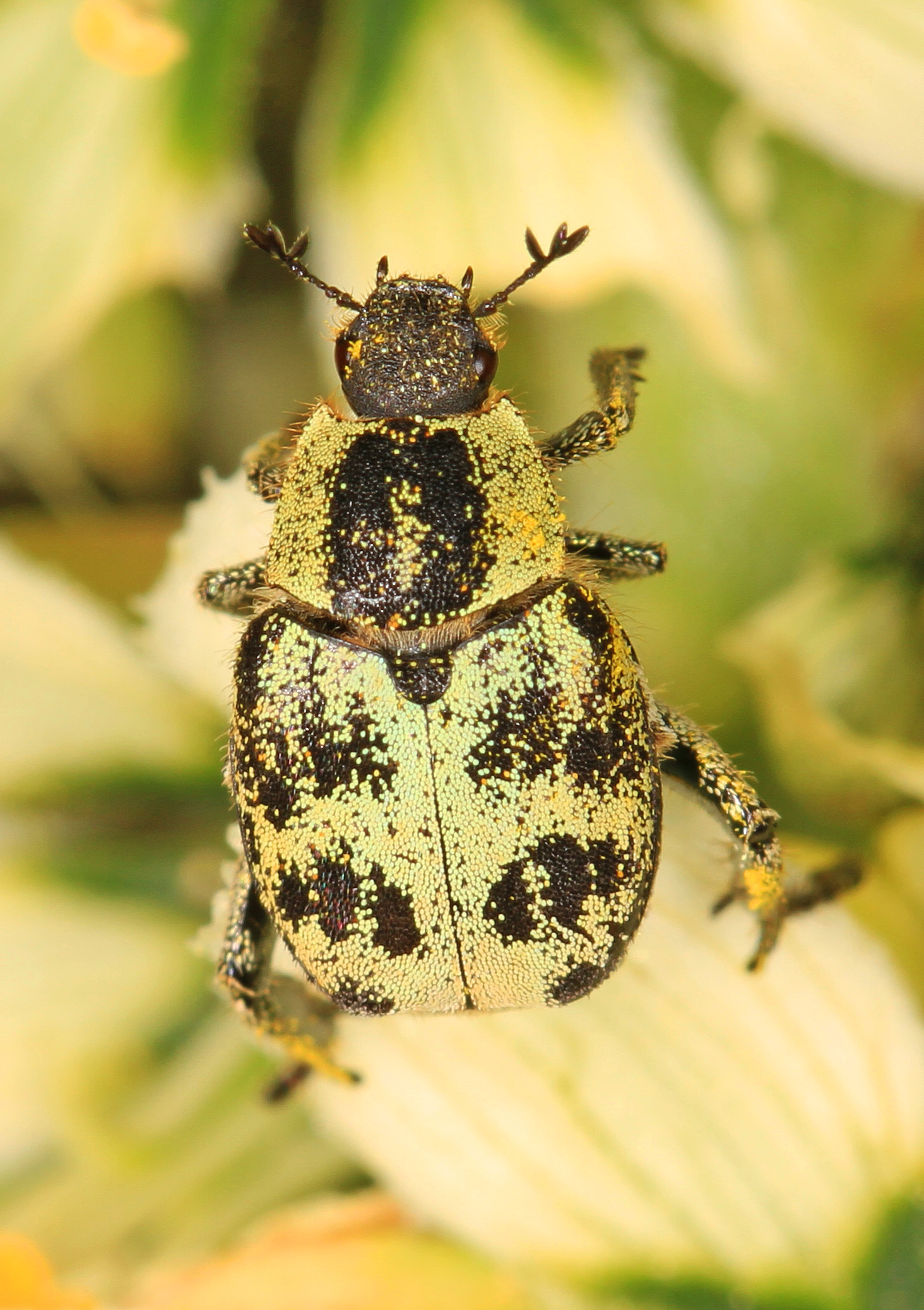
- Hoplia dispar

Scientific classification
- Kingdom: Animalia
- Phylum: Arthropoda
- Clade: Pancrustacea
- Class: Insecta
- Order: Coleoptera
- Suborder: Polyphaga
- Infraorder: Scarabaeiformia
- Family: Scarabaeidae
- Subfamily: Melolonthinae
- Tribe: Hopliini
- Genus: Hoplia; Illiger, 1803

= Hoplia =

Genus of beetles

Hoplia is a genus of monkey beetles in the family Scarabaeidae. At least 300 species in Hoplia have been described. These species are found in Asia, Europe, South Africa, Madagascar, and the Americas.

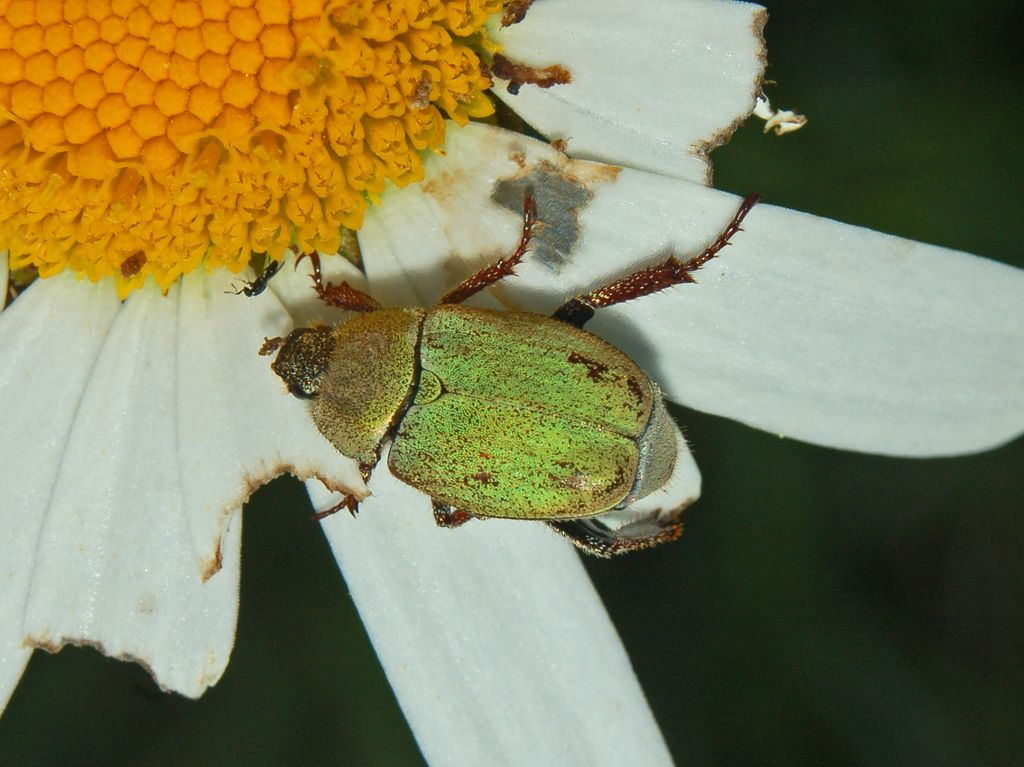
Hoplia argentea

== See also ==
- Hoplia species list
