= Goniaspidius =

Scientific classification
- Kingdom: Animalia
- Phylum: Arthropoda
- Class: Insecta
- Order: Coleoptera
- Suborder: Polyphaga
- Infraorder: Scarabaeiformia
- Family: Scarabaeidae
- Subfamily: Melolonthinae
- Tribe: Hopliini
- Genus: Goniaspidius; Burmeister, 1844

Genus beetles

Goniaspidius is a genus of beetles belonging to the family Scarabaeidae.

== Species ==
- Goniaspidius angolensis Schein, 1958
- Goniaspidius brevis Burmeister, 1844
- Goniaspidius lebisi (Schein, 1959)

== Former species ==
- Goniaspidius lividipennis Boheman, 1857
- Goniaspidius simplex Péringuey, 1902
