= Omocrates humilis =

Scientific classification
- Kingdom: Animalia
- Phylum: Arthropoda
- Class: Insecta
- Order: Coleoptera
- Suborder: Polyphaga
- Infraorder: Scarabaeiformia
- Family: Scarabaeidae
- Genus: Omocrates
- Species: O. humilis

Binomial name
- Omocrates humilis Péringuey, 1902

Species of beetle

Omocrates humilis is a species of beetle of the family Scarabaeidae. It is found in South Africa (Western Cape).

== Description ==
Adults reach a length of about 4.5 mm (0.18 in). Males are similar to Omocrates depressus and Omocrates spatulipennis. They are black, with the elytra testaceous and the legs rufescent. The pronotum is covered from the base to three-fourths of the length with villose erect greyish hairs, and there is no basal band of appressed hairs. The elytra have a few inconspicuous, pallid, appressed hairs and the propygidium and pygidium are covered with contiguous, pale yellow, round scales, and the edge of the abdominal segments have more elongate, somewhat filiform ones of the same colour. Females are similar to males, but the pygidial part and abdomen are villose.
