= Omocrates modestus =

Scientific classification
- Kingdom: Animalia
- Phylum: Arthropoda
- Class: Insecta
- Order: Coleoptera
- Suborder: Polyphaga
- Infraorder: Scarabaeiformia
- Family: Scarabaeidae
- Genus: Omocrates
- Species: O. modestus

Binomial name
- Omocrates modestus Péringuey, 1902

Species of beetle

Omocrates modestus is a species of beetle of the family Scarabaeidae. It is found in South Africa (Eastern Cape).

== Description ==
Adults reach a length of about 5 mm (0.20 in). They are similar to Omocrates axillaris in colour, vestiture, and build, but they are much smaller, the hind legs are robust and the scales on the propygidium and pygidium are so closely set that they form a thick coating, and they are not yellow as in O. axillaris.
