= Omocrates placens =

Scientific classification
- Kingdom: Animalia
- Phylum: Arthropoda
- Class: Insecta
- Order: Coleoptera
- Suborder: Polyphaga
- Infraorder: Scarabaeiformia
- Family: Scarabaeidae
- Genus: Omocrates
- Species: O. placens

Binomial name
- Omocrates placens Péringuey, 1902

Species of beetle

Omocrates placens is a species of beetle of the family Scarabaeidae. It is found in South Africa (Western Cape).

== Description ==
Adults reach a length of about 3.25–4 mm (0.128–0.157 in). They are very similar to Omocrates depressus. The shape of the clypeus is the same, but the pronotum is more elongated and less attenuated laterally in the anterior part, and is completely covered with closely set, slightly lanuginose scales nearly similar to those on the elytra. These scales are greyer and in the pygidial part they are only flavescent instead of being bright yellow.
