= Omocrates =

Scientific classification
- Kingdom: Animalia
- Phylum: Arthropoda
- Class: Insecta
- Order: Coleoptera
- Suborder: Polyphaga
- Infraorder: Scarabaeiformia
- Family: Scarabaeidae
- Subfamily: Melolonthinae
- Tribe: Hopliini
- Genus: Omocrates; Burmeister, 1844

Genus beetles

Omocrates is a genus of beetles belonging to the family Scarabaeidae.

== Species ==
- Omocrates andreaei Schein, 1958
- Omocrates axillaris Burmeister, 1844
- Omocrates canaliculatus (Blanchard, 1850)
- Omocrates cylindricus (Burmeister, 1844)
- Omocrates depressus (Blanchard, 1850)
- Omocrates elongatus (Blanchard, 1850)
- Omocrates hessei Schein, 1958
- Omocrates humilis Péringuey, 1902
- Omocrates karrooanus Schein, 1958
- Omocrates lividipennis (Boheman, 1857)
- Omocrates lobipes Burmeister, 1844
- Omocrates luridipennis Burmeister, 1844
- Omocrates mendax Péringuey, 1902
- Omocrates misellus Péringuey, 1902
- Omocrates modestus Péringuey, 1902
- Omocrates namaquensis Schein, 1958
- Omocrates pauxillus Péringuey, 1902
- Omocrates placens Péringuey, 1902
- Omocrates placidus Péringuey, 1902
- Omocrates plausibilis Péringuey, 1902
- Omocrates pseudoplacidus Schein, 1958
- Omocrates pygidialis Schein, 1958
- Omocrates spatulipennis (Blanchard, 1850)
- Omocrates variabilis (Burmeister, 1844)

== Selected former species ==
- Omocrates flavipennis (Blanchard, 1850)
- Omocrates lebisi Schein, 1959
