= Omocrates pseudoplacidus =

Scientific classification
- Kingdom: Animalia
- Phylum: Arthropoda
- Class: Insecta
- Order: Coleoptera
- Suborder: Polyphaga
- Infraorder: Scarabaeiformia
- Family: Scarabaeidae
- Genus: Omocrates
- Species: O. pseudoplacidus

Binomial name
- Omocrates pseudoplacidus Schein, 1958

Species of beetle

Omocrates pseudoplacidus is a species of beetle of the family Scarabaeidae. It is found in South Africa (Western Cape).

== Description ==
Adults reach a length of about 5.5–6 mm (0.22–0.24 in). They are black with pale yellow elytra, which are darkened at the rear. They are similar to Omocrates placidus, but may be distinguished from it by its deeply furrowed pronotum.
