= Omocrates namaquensis =

Scientific classification
- Kingdom: Animalia
- Phylum: Arthropoda
- Class: Insecta
- Order: Coleoptera
- Suborder: Polyphaga
- Infraorder: Scarabaeiformia
- Family: Scarabaeidae
- Genus: Omocrates
- Species: O. namaquensis

Binomial name
- Omocrates namaquensis Schein, 1958

Species of beetle

Omocrates namaquensis is a species of beetle of the family Scarabaeidae. It is found in South Africa (Northern Cape).

== Description ==
Adults reach a length of about 4 mm (0.16 in). They are black with yellowish-brown elytra. They are similar to Omocrates cylindricus, but has a more convex pronotum and a sparsely scaled pygidial area.
