= Omocrates plausibilis =

Scientific classification
- Kingdom: Animalia
- Phylum: Arthropoda
- Class: Insecta
- Order: Coleoptera
- Suborder: Polyphaga
- Infraorder: Scarabaeiformia
- Family: Scarabaeidae
- Genus: Omocrates
- Species: O. plausibilis

Binomial name
- Omocrates plausibilis Péringuey, 1902

Species of beetle

Omocrates plausibilis is a species of beetle of the family Scarabaeidae. It is found in South Africa (Eastern Cape).

== Description ==
Adults reach a length of about 5.5 mm (0.22 in). They are black, with the elytra light testaceous and the legs reddish. The pronotum is clothed for two-thirds of the length with dense, erect, greyish villose hairs, while the posterior part is covered with dense, yellow, somewhat elongated scales. The scutellum and elytra are covered with similar scales. The pygidial part is closely scaly, with the scales somewhat round and deeper yellow than on the elytra. The abdomen has squamose appressed hairs, which are flavescent on the apical segments and turning to white on the basal ones.
