= Omocrates placidus =

Scientific classification
- Kingdom: Animalia
- Phylum: Arthropoda
- Class: Insecta
- Order: Coleoptera
- Suborder: Polyphaga
- Infraorder: Scarabaeiformia
- Family: Scarabaeidae
- Genus: Omocrates
- Species: O. placidus

Binomial name
- Omocrates placidus Péringuey, 1902

Species of beetle

Omocrates placidus is a species of beetle of the family Scarabaeidae. It is found in South Africa (Western Cape).

== Description ==
Adults reach a length of about 5 mm (0.20 in). They are very similar in shape and sculpture to Omocrates luridipennis, but the elytra are light testaceous, and infuscate laterally behind, and the pubescence on the pronotum is longer. The propygidium and pygidium are covered with thick flavescent scales of uniform colour.
