= Omocrates hessei =

Scientific classification
- Kingdom: Animalia
- Phylum: Arthropoda
- Class: Insecta
- Order: Coleoptera
- Suborder: Polyphaga
- Infraorder: Scarabaeiformia
- Family: Scarabaeidae
- Genus: Omocrates
- Species: O. hessei

Binomial name
- Omocrates hessei Schein, 1958

Species of beetle

Omocrates hessei is a species of beetle of the family Scarabaeidae. It is found in South Africa (Western Cape).

== Description ==
Adults reach a length of about 5–6 mm (0.20–0.24 in). They have a very long, narrow black body, with pale yellow elytra. The pygidial area has orange-yellow scales.
