= Omocrates canaliculatus =

Scientific classification
- Kingdom: Animalia
- Phylum: Arthropoda
- Class: Insecta
- Order: Coleoptera
- Suborder: Polyphaga
- Infraorder: Scarabaeiformia
- Family: Scarabaeidae
- Genus: Omocrates
- Species: O. canaliculatus

Binomial name
- Omocrates canaliculatus (Blanchard, 1850)

Synonyms
- Goniaspidius canaliculatus Blanchard, 1850

Species of beetle

Omocrates canaliculatus is a species of beetle of the family Scarabaeidae. It is found in South Africa (Western Cape).

== Description ==
Adults reach a length of about 4 mm (0.16 in). They are black and nearly glabrous, with the antennae, legs and abdomen rufous. The head is rugose. The pronotum is punctate and shining, with the sides setose and with the median part very broadly furrowed. The scutellum is fuscous. The elytra are short, punctate, testaceous, and somewhat rufescent at the base and at the apex. The pygidium is clothed with flavous scales.
