= Omocrates lobipes =

Scientific classification
- Kingdom: Animalia
- Phylum: Arthropoda
- Class: Insecta
- Order: Coleoptera
- Suborder: Polyphaga
- Infraorder: Scarabaeiformia
- Family: Scarabaeidae
- Genus: Omocrates
- Species: O. lobipes

Binomial name
- Omocrates lobipes Burmeister, 1844

Species of beetle

Omocrates lobipes is a species of beetle of the family Scarabaeidae. It is found in South Africa (Eastern Cape).

== Description ==
Adults reach a length of about 4 mm (0.16 in). They are black, shining and hairy. The hairs underneath are white. The elytra are pale and edged with black, while the pygidium has flavous scales.
