= Omocrates spatulipennis =

Scientific classification
- Kingdom: Animalia
- Phylum: Arthropoda
- Class: Insecta
- Order: Coleoptera
- Suborder: Polyphaga
- Infraorder: Scarabaeiformia
- Family: Scarabaeidae
- Genus: Omocrates
- Species: O. spatulipennis

Binomial name
- Omocrates spatulipennis (Blanchard, 1850)

Synonyms
- Goniaspidius spatulipennis Blanchard, 1850; Goniaspidius lepidus Boheman, 1857

Species of beetle

Omocrates spatulipennis is a species of beetle of the family Scarabaeidae. It is found in South Africa (KwaZulu-Natal, Free State).

== Description ==
Adults reach a length of about 4.75–5.75 mm (0.187–0.226 in). Males are black, with the elytra light testaceous, and the legs piceous or piceous red. They are similar in shape and sculpture to Omocrates depressus, but the clypeus is much more strongly dentate on each side of the apex, and is also a little more concave in front. The pronotum has no scales and is clothed with dense greyish villose hairs from the base to two thirds of the length, and has a very narrow border of appressed greyish or sub-flavescent hairs along the base. The scutellum has squamiform yellow hairs and the elytra have appressed, not dense, hair-like, short yellow scales. The pygidial part and abdomen are clothed with contiguous, round, bright yellow scales. Females are similar to males, but the clypeus is not so sharply dentate on each side, the hairs on the elytra are more filiform, and the scales on the pygidial part and abdomen are replaced by appressed white hairs.
