= Goniaspidius angolensis =

Scientific classification
- Kingdom: Animalia
- Phylum: Arthropoda
- Class: Insecta
- Order: Coleoptera
- Suborder: Polyphaga
- Infraorder: Scarabaeiformia
- Family: Scarabaeidae
- Genus: Goniaspidius
- Species: G. angolensis

Binomial name
- Goniaspidius angolensis Schein, 1958

Species of beetle

Goniaspidius angolensis is a species of beetle of the family Scarabaeidae. It is found in Angola.

== Description ==
Adults reach a length of about 5 mm (0.20 in). They are black with reddish-brown elytra with white hairs and without bands.
