= Omocrates variabilis =

Scientific classification
- Kingdom: Animalia
- Phylum: Arthropoda
- Class: Insecta
- Order: Coleoptera
- Suborder: Polyphaga
- Infraorder: Scarabaeiformia
- Family: Scarabaeidae
- Genus: Omocrates
- Species: O. variabilis

Binomial name
- Omocrates variabilis (Burmeister, 1844)

Synonyms
- Goniaspidius variabilis Burmeister, 1844

Species of beetle

Omocrates variabilis is a species of beetle of the family Scarabaeidae. It is found in South Africa (Eastern Cape).

== Description ==
Adults reach a length of about 3.5–4.5 mm (0.14–0.18 in). Males are black, with the elytra light testaceous and the basal part narrowly fuscous, or occasionally with the pronotum reddish and the hind legs reddish brown. The pronotum is clothed for two-thirds of the length with a short, dense, greyish pubescence, and has a narrow basal band of greyish, sometimes sub-flavescent scales. The scutellum is densely scaly and the elytra are also densely scaly, with the scales elongated, sub-lanuginose and not unlike appressed squamose hairs. These scales are greyish or sub-flavescent, those with which the abdomen is densely clothed are almost similar in shape, but on the pygidial part they are normally rounded and more flavescent. Females are similar to males, but the pygidial part is scaly.
