= Goniaspidius brevis =

Scientific classification
- Kingdom: Animalia
- Phylum: Arthropoda
- Class: Insecta
- Order: Coleoptera
- Suborder: Polyphaga
- Infraorder: Scarabaeiformia
- Family: Scarabaeidae
- Genus: Goniaspidius
- Species: G. brevis

Binomial name
- Goniaspidius brevis Burmeister, 1844

Species of beetle

Goniaspidius brevis is a species of beetle of the family Scarabaeidae. It is found in South Africa (Western Cape).

== Description ==
Adults reach a length of about 5.5–6 mm (0.22–0.24 in). They are black, but with the discoidal part of the elytra and the legs reddish brown in females. The head and pronotum are clothed with villose, dense, greyish and black hairs. The pronotum is depressed in the basal part, which is nearly impunctate, the rest of the surface is, however, scabroso-punctate. The scutellum is hairy along the apical border. The elytra have three bands of appressed squamose greyish white or slightly flavescent hairs on each side. The propygidium is clothed with appressed, squamiform, sub-flavescent hairs and the under side is somewhat densely hairy.
