= Omocrates elongatus =

Scientific classification
- Kingdom: Animalia
- Phylum: Arthropoda
- Class: Insecta
- Order: Coleoptera
- Suborder: Polyphaga
- Infraorder: Scarabaeiformia
- Family: Scarabaeidae
- Genus: Omocrates
- Species: O. elongatus

Binomial name
- Omocrates elongatus (Blanchard, 1850)

Synonyms
- Goniaspidius elongatus Blanchard, 1850

Species of beetle

Omocrates elongatus is a species of beetle of the family Scarabaeidae. It is found in South Africa (Western Cape).

== Description ==
Adults reach a length of about 5.25 mm (0.207 in). They are black, pilose, with ashy-grey hairs. The antennae and palpi are fuscous. The pronotum is convex, closely punctate, and clothed with greyish hairs. The scutellum is squamose and the elytra are testaceous red, elongate and sparsely pilose. The legs are black. The abdomen and pygidium are clothed with greyish hairs.
