= Rectoscutaria =

Scientific classification
- Kingdom: Animalia
- Phylum: Arthropoda
- Class: Insecta
- Order: Coleoptera
- Suborder: Polyphaga
- Infraorder: Scarabaeiformia
- Family: Scarabaeidae
- Subfamily: Melolonthinae
- Tribe: Hopliini
- Genus: Rectoscutaria; Schein, 1958

Genus beetles

Rectoscutaria is a genus of beetles belonging to the family Scarabaeidae.

== Species ==
- Rectoscutaria peringueyi Schein, 1958
- Rectoscutaria simplex (Péringuey, 1902)
