= Rectoscutaria peringueyi =

Scientific classification
- Kingdom: Animalia
- Phylum: Arthropoda
- Class: Insecta
- Order: Coleoptera
- Suborder: Polyphaga
- Infraorder: Scarabaeiformia
- Family: Scarabaeidae
- Genus: Rectoscutaria
- Species: R. peringueyi

Binomial name
- Rectoscutaria peringueyi Schein, 1958

Synonyms
- Goniaspidius brevis Péringuey, 1902 (not Burmeister); Rectoscutaria peringueyi lunata Schein, 1958; Rectoscutaria peringueyi uniformis Schein, 1958

Species of beetle

Rectoscutaria peringueyi is a species of beetle of the family Scarabaeidae. It is found in South Africa (Eastern Cape, Northern Cape, Western Cape).

== Description ==
Adults reach a length of about 5–6 mm (0.20–0.24 in). They are black. The elytra are wholly or partly brown and the pygidium is covered with yellow scales. The scaling of the upper surface is variable. There may be white hair-like scales that form three longitudinal bands on each elytron, but these bands may also be shortened to form a forward-facing arc and finally, some specimens have no bands, but fine grey hairs across the entire surface.
