= Omocrates misellus =

Scientific classification
- Kingdom: Animalia
- Phylum: Arthropoda
- Class: Insecta
- Order: Coleoptera
- Suborder: Polyphaga
- Infraorder: Scarabaeiformia
- Family: Scarabaeidae
- Genus: Omocrates
- Species: O. misellus

Binomial name
- Omocrates misellus Péringuey, 1902

Species of beetle

Omocrates misellus is a species of beetle of the family Scarabaeidae. It is found in South Africa (Northern Cape).

== Description ==
Adults reach a length of about 5.25 mm (0.207 in). They are black, with the elytra pale flavous and the legs rufescent. The pronotum is clothed all over the surface with long, greyish white villose hairs, and it has in the centre a deep, median sulcus reaching from the base to the apex. The scutellum has squamose greyish hairs and the elytra are covered with short, flavescent sub-squamose, not densely set hairs, but also have along the suture, the discoidal part, and the outer margin a distinct but not conspicuous narrow band of ovate scales not set close to each other except on the apical margin where they are denser and deeper yellow. The propygidium and pygidium are clothed with contiguous golden yellow scales and the abdomen is clothed with similar scales which, however, turn to white on the anterior segments.
