= Omocrates luridipennis =

Scientific classification
- Kingdom: Animalia
- Phylum: Arthropoda
- Class: Insecta
- Order: Coleoptera
- Suborder: Polyphaga
- Infraorder: Scarabaeiformia
- Family: Scarabaeidae
- Genus: Omocrates
- Species: O. luridipennis

Binomial name
- Omocrates luridipennis Burmeister, 1844

Species of beetle

Omocrates luridipennis is a species of beetle of the family Scarabaeidae. It is found in South Africa (Western Cape).

== Description ==
Adults reach a length of about 5 mm (0.20 in). Males are black, with the elytra and the legs reddish brown, but the elytra are occasionally testaceous at the base. The head is similar to that of Omocrates mendax, but the outer angles are not quite so sharp. Also, the pubescence on the pronotum is not so dense nor so villose and the elytra are also less pubescent, but in the apical part there is a somewhat distinct band of sub-squamose flavescent hairs. The propygidium has a very broad band of bright yellow hairs and two large round patches of brown tomentose scales, and the pygidium has also two similar patches at the base. Females are similar to males, but more hairy on the pygidial part, and with the appressed hairs concolorous.
