= Omocrates andreaei =

Scientific classification
- Kingdom: Animalia
- Phylum: Arthropoda
- Class: Insecta
- Order: Coleoptera
- Suborder: Polyphaga
- Infraorder: Scarabaeiformia
- Family: Scarabaeidae
- Genus: Omocrates
- Species: O. andreaei

Binomial name
- Omocrates andreaei Schein, 1958

Species of beetle

Omocrates andreaei is a species of beetle of the family Scarabaeidae. It is found in South Africa (Western Cape).

== Description ==
Adults reach a length of about 4–5 mm (0.16–0.20 in). They are black with bluish-yellow elytra and a densely yellow-scaled pygidial area.
