= Omocrates pauxillus =

Scientific classification
- Kingdom: Animalia
- Phylum: Arthropoda
- Class: Insecta
- Order: Coleoptera
- Suborder: Polyphaga
- Infraorder: Scarabaeiformia
- Family: Scarabaeidae
- Genus: Omocrates
- Species: O. pauxillus

Binomial name
- Omocrates pauxillus Péringuey, 1902

Species of beetle

Omocrates pauxillus is a species of beetle of the family Scarabaeidae. It is found in South Africa (Western Cape).

== Description ==
Adults reach a length of about 4.5 mm (0.18 in). They are brick-red, with the head and anterior part of the pronotum slightly infuscate. The pronotum is very slightly pubescent, and not closely punctulate behind, while the scutellum is scarcely pubescent. The elytra have an appressed, greyish pubescence and the apical margin of the propygidium and the pygidium are covered with round contiguous yellow scales. The abdomen has somewhat dense, long, whitish hairs.
