= Omocrates pygidialis =

Scientific classification
- Kingdom: Animalia
- Phylum: Arthropoda
- Class: Insecta
- Order: Coleoptera
- Suborder: Polyphaga
- Infraorder: Scarabaeiformia
- Family: Scarabaeidae
- Genus: Omocrates
- Species: O. pygidialis

Binomial name
- Omocrates pygidialis Schein, 1958

Species of beetle

Omocrates pygidialis is a species of beetle of the family Scarabaeidae. It is found in South Africa (Eastern Cape).

== Description ==
Adults reach a length of about 5–5.5 mm (0.20–0.22 in). They are black with yellowish-brown elytra. The propygidium and pygidium of the males are densely covered with dark brown scales in the basal part, and with light yellow scales on the rest of the surface.
