= Omocrates karrooanus =

Scientific classification
- Kingdom: Animalia
- Phylum: Arthropoda
- Class: Insecta
- Order: Coleoptera
- Suborder: Polyphaga
- Infraorder: Scarabaeiformia
- Family: Scarabaeidae
- Genus: Omocrates
- Species: O. karrooanus

Binomial name
- Omocrates karrooanus Schein, 1958

Species of beetle

Omocrates karrooanus is a species of beetle of the family Scarabaeidae. It is found in South Africa (Western Cape).

== Description ==
Adults reach a length of about 6–6.5 mm (0.24–0.26 in). They are black with bluish-yellow, laterally darkened elytra and a densely greyish-yellow scaled pygidial area.
