= Omocrates axillaris =

Scientific classification
- Kingdom: Animalia
- Phylum: Arthropoda
- Class: Insecta
- Order: Coleoptera
- Suborder: Polyphaga
- Infraorder: Scarabaeiformia
- Family: Scarabaeidae
- Genus: Omocrates
- Species: O. axillaris

Binomial name
- Omocrates axillaris Burmeister, 1844

Species of beetle

Omocrates axillaris is a species of beetle of the family Scarabaeidae. It is found in South Africa (Western Cape).

== Description ==
Adults reach a length of about 6.75–7 mm (0.266–0.276 in). Males are black, with the elytra pale testaceous and edged with a fuscous marginal band broadening towards the posterior part. The head and pronotum are clothed with a dense, erect, sub-flavescent pubescence. The scutellum is clothed with a few greyish hairs and the elytra are covered with deep, irregular punctures. They are very briefly pubescent. The propygidium and pygidium are clothed with dense, thick, flavescent or yellow scales, while the abdomen is without scales. Females are similar to males, but the propygidium and pygidium are covered with squamose appressed flavescent hairs and the pygidium has two distinct patches of browner hairs in the centre.
