= Omocrates mendax =

Scientific classification
- Kingdom: Animalia
- Phylum: Arthropoda
- Class: Insecta
- Order: Coleoptera
- Suborder: Polyphaga
- Infraorder: Scarabaeiformia
- Family: Scarabaeidae
- Genus: Omocrates
- Species: O. mendax

Binomial name
- Omocrates mendax Péringuey, 1902

Species of beetle

Omocrates mendax is a species of beetle of the family Scarabaeidae. It is found in South Africa (Northern Cape).

== Description ==
Adults reach a length of about 6–6.25 mm (0.236–0.246 in). They are black, with the elytra light testaceous and with a lateral and apical infuscate band beginning at about the middle of the side and reaching the suture. The head is scabrose and covered (like the pronotum) with a very dense, somewhat appressed light fulvous pubescence. The elytra are covered with appressed, sub-flavescent fine hairs, while the propygidium, pygidium and abdomen are covered with flavescent or yellow lanuginose scales (which are all of the same colour on the pygidium). The hind legs are densely hairy.
