= Rectoscutaria simplex =

Scientific classification
- Kingdom: Animalia
- Phylum: Arthropoda
- Class: Insecta
- Order: Coleoptera
- Suborder: Polyphaga
- Infraorder: Scarabaeiformia
- Family: Scarabaeidae
- Genus: Rectoscutaria
- Species: R. simplex

Binomial name
- Rectoscutaria simplex (Péringuey, 1902)

Synonyms
- Goniaspidius simplex Péringuey, 1902

Species of beetle

Rectoscutaria simplex is a species of beetle of the family Scarabaeidae. It is found in South Africa (Western Cape).

== Description ==
Adults reach a length of about 5.5–7 mm (0.22–0.28 in). They are black, with the elytra testaceous with a broad fuscous border all round. The head and pronotum are clothed with dense black and greyish villose hairs. The pronotum is scabroso-punctate from the apex to the base, which is not very depressed. The elytra are not costate, but have a longitudinal impression along the suture, which is deeply and closely punctured. The punctures bearing each a black, erect hair. The pygidium is briefly hairy and the under side is villose, with greyish-white hairs.
