= Goniaspidius lebisi =

Scientific classification
- Kingdom: Animalia
- Phylum: Arthropoda
- Class: Insecta
- Order: Coleoptera
- Suborder: Polyphaga
- Infraorder: Scarabaeiformia
- Family: Scarabaeidae
- Genus: Goniaspidius
- Species: G. lebisi

Binomial name
- Goniaspidius lebisi (Schein, 1959)

Synonyms
- Omocrates lebisi Schein, 1959

Species of beetle

Goniaspidius lebisi is a species of beetle of the family Scarabaeidae. It is found in the Democratic Republic of the Congo.

== Description ==
Adults reach a length of about 3 mm (0.12 in). They are black with reddish-brown elytra with two unscaled ribs and three longitudinal bands of thick white hairs. The pygidial area is covered with yellow scales.

== Taxonomy ==
The original description was part of paper that was published in 1959. However, in another paper, that was written later, but published earlier (in 1958), Shein transferred the species to the genus Goniaspidius.
