= Omocrates cylindricus =

Scientific classification
- Kingdom: Animalia
- Phylum: Arthropoda
- Class: Insecta
- Order: Coleoptera
- Suborder: Polyphaga
- Infraorder: Scarabaeiformia
- Family: Scarabaeidae
- Genus: Omocrates
- Species: O. cylindricus

Binomial name
- Omocrates cylindricus (Burmeister, 1844)

Synonyms
- Goniaspidius cylindricus Burmeister, 1844; Platychelus flavipennis Blanchard, 1850; Omocrates flavipennis

Species of beetle

Omocrates cylindricus is a species of beetle of the family Scarabaeidae. It is found in South Africa (Western Cape).

== Description ==
Adults reach a length of about 4 mm (0.16 in). Males are black, with the elytra flavous. The head and pronotum are densely villose, with the hairs flavescent. At the base of the pronotum, there are some squamose yellow appressed hairs forming a narrow marginal line, which is often obliterated. The scutellum has yellow squamose hairs. The elytra are not costulate but impressed longitudinally along the suture and on the disk, roughly punctate and clothed with fine, somewhat dense, slightly flavescent appressed hairs. The pygidial part and abdomen are covered with contiguous round yellow scales. Females are similar to males, but the angles of the clypeus are not so sharp, the pubescence on the elytra is not quite so dense, and the pygidial part is covered with appressed yellow hairs.
