= Omocrates lividipennis =

Scientific classification
- Kingdom: Animalia
- Phylum: Arthropoda
- Class: Insecta
- Order: Coleoptera
- Suborder: Polyphaga
- Infraorder: Scarabaeiformia
- Family: Scarabaeidae
- Genus: Omocrates
- Species: O. lividipennis

Binomial name
- Omocrates lividipennis (Boheman, 1857)

Synonyms
- Goniaspidius lividipennis Boheman, 1857

Species of beetle

Omocrates lividipennis is a species of beetle of the family Scarabaeidae. It is found in South Africa (Western Cape).

== Description ==
Adults reach a length of about 5 mm (0.20 in). They have a shortly ovate, moderately convex, black, moderately shiny body. The elytra, head and pronotum have grey hairs.
