= Omocrates depressus =

Scientific classification
- Kingdom: Animalia
- Phylum: Arthropoda
- Class: Insecta
- Order: Coleoptera
- Suborder: Polyphaga
- Infraorder: Scarabaeiformia
- Family: Scarabaeidae
- Genus: Omocrates
- Species: O. depressus

Binomial name
- Omocrates depressus (Blanchard, 1850)

Synonyms
- Goniaspidius depressus Blanchard, 1850

Species of beetle

Omocrates depressus is a species of beetle of the family Scarabaeidae. It is found in South Africa (Western Cape).

== Description ==
Adults reach a length of about 4–4.25 mm (0.157–0.167 in). Males are black, with the legs red. The head and pronotum are covered with very short, erect pubescence, but on the pronotum, this pubescence is intermingled with golden-yellow squamose hairs. The scutellum is densely scaly and the elytra are densely clothed with somewhat round, golden-yellow scales which are not, however, contiguous, and are somewhat more elongated and hair-like on the sides and on the apical margin. The propygidium, pygidium and abdomen are thickly covered with golden yellow scales. Females are similar to males, but the pronotum is less scaly, and the scales on the elytra and the pygidial part are a little paler in colour. Also, the scales on the pygidial part are more hair-like.
