= Eriesthis dubiosa =

Scientific classification
- Kingdom: Animalia
- Phylum: Arthropoda
- Class: Insecta
- Order: Coleoptera
- Suborder: Polyphaga
- Infraorder: Scarabaeiformia
- Family: Scarabaeidae
- Genus: Eriesthis
- Species: E. dubiosa

Binomial name
- Eriesthis dubiosa Péringuey, 1902

Species of beetle

Eriesthis dubiosa is a species of beetle of the family Scarabaeidae. It is found in South Africa (Limpopo).

== Description ==
Adults reach a length of about 6–7 mm (0.24–0.28 in). They are black, with the elytra reddish. The head and pronotum are similar to those of Eriesthis guttata, but the hairs and scales are not such a bright yellow. The scutellum is squamose, and the elytra are covered with appressed hairs which can hardly be called squamose.
