= Eriesthis aequatoria =

Scientific classification
- Kingdom: Animalia
- Phylum: Arthropoda
- Class: Insecta
- Order: Coleoptera
- Suborder: Polyphaga
- Infraorder: Scarabaeiformia
- Family: Scarabaeidae
- Genus: Eriesthis
- Species: E. aequatoria

Binomial name
- Eriesthis aequatoria Fairmaire, 1887

Species of beetle

Eriesthis aequatoria is a species of beetle of the family Scarabaeidae. It is found in Tanzania and Zimbabwe.

== Description ==
Adults reach a length of about 6.5 mm (0.26 in). They are very similar to Eriesthis guttata, but the hairs on the pronotum are shorter and gradually blend with the scaling of the basal part.
