= Pareriesthis ertli =

Scientific classification
- Kingdom: Animalia
- Phylum: Arthropoda
- Clade: Pancrustacea
- Class: Insecta
- Order: Coleoptera
- Suborder: Polyphaga
- Infraorder: Scarabaeiformia
- Family: Scarabaeidae
- Genus: Pareriesthis
- Species: P. ertli

Binomial name
- Pareriesthis ertli Moser, 1919

Species of beetle

Pareriesthis ertli is a species of beetle of the family Scarabaeidae. It is found in Angola.

== Description ==
Adults reach a length of about 8 mm (0.31 in). They are similar to Pareriesthis bicornuta, but the scales of the males and hairs of the females are yellowish-brown. Also, there is a large, round, dark spot in the basal half of each elytron.
