= Eriesthis rhodesiana =

Scientific classification
- Kingdom: Animalia
- Phylum: Arthropoda
- Class: Insecta
- Order: Coleoptera
- Suborder: Polyphaga
- Infraorder: Scarabaeiformia
- Family: Scarabaeidae
- Genus: Eriesthis
- Species: E. rhodesiana

Binomial name
- Eriesthis rhodesiana Schein, 1959

Species of beetle

Eriesthis rhodesiana is a species of beetle of the family Scarabaeidae. It is found in Zimbabwe.

== Description ==
Adults reach a length of about 6 mm (0.24 in). They are black. The elytra are dark brown with a poorly defined transverse band of short white hairs.
