= Eriesthis semihirta =

Scientific classification
- Kingdom: Animalia
- Phylum: Arthropoda
- Class: Insecta
- Order: Coleoptera
- Suborder: Polyphaga
- Infraorder: Scarabaeiformia
- Family: Scarabaeidae
- Genus: Eriesthis
- Species: E. semihirta

Binomial name
- Eriesthis semihirta Burmeister, 1844

Species of beetle

Eriesthis semihirta is a species of beetle of the family Scarabaeidae. It is found in South Africa (Eastern Cape, Western Cape, Limpopo).

== Description ==
Adults reach a length of about 8 mm (0.31 in). They are black, with the elytra dark chestnut-brown. The head and anterior part of the pronotum are covered with yellow hairs, and the posterior part of the pronotum with dense, squamose orange-yellow ones. The scutellum is densely squamose. The elytra are clothed with orange-yellow, squamose hairs leaving on the dorsal part on each side three transverse patches. The pygidium and upper sides of the abdomen are clothed with bright orange, squamiform hairs, except on the lower side of abdomen, where they are grey.
