= Eriesthis oberprieleri =

Scientific classification
- Kingdom: Animalia
- Phylum: Arthropoda
- Clade: Pancrustacea
- Class: Insecta
- Order: Coleoptera
- Suborder: Polyphaga
- Infraorder: Scarabaeiformia
- Family: Scarabaeidae
- Genus: Eriesthis
- Species: E. oberprieleri

Binomial name
- Eriesthis oberprieleri Dombrow, 1997

Species of beetle

Eriesthis oberprieleri is a species of beetle of the family Scarabaeidae. It is found in South Africa (KwaZulu-Natal, Free State) and Lesotho.
