= Eriesthis stigmatica =

Scientific classification
- Kingdom: Animalia
- Phylum: Arthropoda
- Class: Insecta
- Order: Coleoptera
- Suborder: Polyphaga
- Infraorder: Scarabaeiformia
- Family: Scarabaeidae
- Genus: Eriesthis
- Species: E. stigmatica

Binomial name
- Eriesthis stigmatica (Billberg, 1817)

Synonyms
- Trichius stigmaticus Billberg, 1817

Species of beetle

Eriesthis stigmatica is a species of beetle of the family Scarabaeidae. It is found in South Africa (Eastern Cape, Western Cape, KwaZulu-Natal).

== Description ==
Adults reach a length of about 8–9.5 mm (0.31–0.37 in). They are black, covered on the head and pronotum with a very dense, short pubescence, but having along the base of the latter a somewhat narrow band of golden-yellow scales. The scutellum is densely scaly. The elytra are dark brown and clothed with contiguous small yellow scales, and having on each side two round black or brown spots, and past the median part three more set transversely, and coalescing sometimes so as to form a band. The pygidium is covered with very closely set yellow scales and has a median longitudinal whitish band and a round patch of the same colour on each side.
