= Eriesthis pusilla =

Scientific classification
- Kingdom: Animalia
- Phylum: Arthropoda
- Class: Insecta
- Order: Coleoptera
- Suborder: Polyphaga
- Infraorder: Scarabaeiformia
- Family: Scarabaeidae
- Genus: Eriesthis
- Species: E. pusilla

Binomial name
- Eriesthis pusilla Péringuey, 1902

Species of beetle

Eriesthis pusilla is a species of beetle of the family Scarabaeidae. It is found in South Africa (Free State).

== Description ==
Adults reach a length of about 5.5–6 mm (0.22–0.24 in). They are black, with the head and the pronotum clothed with very dense erect greyish flavescent hairs, and a band of short, squamose, more plainly flavescent appressed ones along the posterior margin. The scutellum is clothed with yellow. The elytra are testaceous and clothed with dense erect greyish hairs, but sprinkled with appressed, yellowish, elongate scales (somewhat hair-like but not hiding the testaceous ground colour).
