= Pareriesthis bidentata =

Scientific classification
- Kingdom: Animalia
- Phylum: Arthropoda
- Clade: Pancrustacea
- Class: Insecta
- Order: Coleoptera
- Suborder: Polyphaga
- Infraorder: Scarabaeiformia
- Family: Scarabaeidae
- Genus: Pareriesthis
- Species: P. bidentata

Binomial name
- Pareriesthis bidentata Moser, 1919

Species of beetle

Pareriesthis bidentata is a species of beetle of the family Scarabaeidae. It is found in Angola.

== Description ==
Adults reach a length of about 6.5 mm (0.26 in). Both males and females are covered in yellowish-brown hairs. The underside is covered with long, light-coloured hairs.
