= Eriesthis decora =

Scientific classification
- Kingdom: Animalia
- Phylum: Arthropoda
- Class: Insecta
- Order: Coleoptera
- Suborder: Polyphaga
- Infraorder: Scarabaeiformia
- Family: Scarabaeidae
- Genus: Eriesthis
- Species: E. decora

Binomial name
- Eriesthis decora Péringuey, 1902

Species of beetle

Eriesthis decora is a species of beetle of the family Scarabaeidae. It is found in South Africa (Eastern Cape, Western Cape, Free State, Gauteng, North West, KwaZulu-Natal) and Lesotho.

== Description ==
Adults reach a length of about 8.5–9.5 mm (0.33–0.37 in). They are black, with the elytra chestnut-red. The head and pronotum are clothed with comparatively short orange-yellow hairs covering the greatest part of the surface, but along the margin there is a moderately broad band of small yellow scales. The scutellum is densely scaly. The elytra are very briefly and closely hairy and have a supra-marginal band of very closely set, small orange scales continued along the apical part and ascending along the suture where it unites with the lower of two transverse bands of similar scales which are interrupted on each side, the basal part is also more or less densely scaly. The pygidium is clothed with yellow squamose hairs which are less squamose and turn to greyish on the abdomen.
