= Pareriesthis =

Scientific classification
- Kingdom: Animalia
- Phylum: Arthropoda
- Clade: Pancrustacea
- Class: Insecta
- Order: Coleoptera
- Suborder: Polyphaga
- Infraorder: Scarabaeiformia
- Family: Scarabaeidae
- Subfamily: Melolonthinae
- Tribe: Hopliini
- Genus: Pareriesthis; Moser, 1918

Genus beetles

Pareriesthis is a genus of beetles belonging to the family Scarabaeidae.

== Species ==
- Pareriesthis acuticornis Moser, 1919
- Pareriesthis bicornuta Moser, 1918
- Pareriesthis bidentata Moser, 1919
- Pareriesthis ertli Moser, 1919
- Pareriesthis ulrichi Dombrow, 1997
