= Eriesthis hessei =

Scientific classification
- Kingdom: Animalia
- Phylum: Arthropoda
- Class: Insecta
- Order: Coleoptera
- Suborder: Polyphaga
- Infraorder: Scarabaeiformia
- Family: Scarabaeidae
- Genus: Eriesthis
- Species: E. hessei

Binomial name
- Eriesthis hessei (Schein, 1959)

Synonyms
- Lepithrix hessei Schein, 1959

Species of beetle

Eriesthis hessei is a species of beetle of the family Scarabaeidae. It is found in South Africa (Gauteng, North West).

== Description ==
Adults reach a length of about 6–7 mm (0.24–0.28 in). They are black, with dark reddish-brown elytra and pitch black antennae.

== Etymology ==
The species is dedicated to Dr. A. J. Hesse from Cape Town.
