= Eriesthis vulpina =

Scientific classification
- Kingdom: Animalia
- Phylum: Arthropoda
- Class: Insecta
- Order: Coleoptera
- Suborder: Polyphaga
- Infraorder: Scarabaeiformia
- Family: Scarabaeidae
- Genus: Eriesthis
- Species: E. vulpina

Binomial name
- Eriesthis vulpina Péringuey, 1902

Species of beetle

Eriesthis vulpina is a species of beetle of the family Scarabaeidae. It is found in South Africa (Eastern Cape, Western Cape, Mpumalanga, Free State, Limpopo, KwaZulu-Natal) and Mozambique.

== Description ==
Adults reach a length of about 6–7.5 mm (0.24–0.30 in). They are black, with the elytra chestnut-brown. The head and pronotum are clothed with long, sub-flavescent, or sometimes greyish hairs which are usually erect. There is no trace of scales, and even along the base the hairs are not squamose. The scutellum is clothed with hairs. The elytra are clothed with sub-erect black and greyish, or sub-flavescent hairs. The pygidium is clothed with long, dense, fulvous hairs turning to greyish or white on the abdomen.
