= Eriesthis hypocrita =

Scientific classification
- Kingdom: Animalia
- Phylum: Arthropoda
- Class: Insecta
- Order: Coleoptera
- Suborder: Polyphaga
- Infraorder: Scarabaeiformia
- Family: Scarabaeidae
- Genus: Eriesthis
- Species: E. hypocrita

Binomial name
- Eriesthis hypocrita Péringuey, 1902

Species of beetle

Eriesthis hypocrita is a species of beetle of the family Scarabaeidae. It is found in Namibia, South Africa (Free State, KwaZulu-Natal, Gauteng, North West, Eastern Cape, Limpopo) and Zimbabwe.

== Description ==
Adults reach a length of about 7–9 mm (0.28–0.35 in). They are black, with the elytra somewhat rufescent, covered on the head and pronotum with pale yellow hairs which are dense, but not long. The posterior part of the pronotum is covered with closely set scales. The scutellum is squamose. The elytra are clothed with scales mixed with very short erect hairs of the same flavescent colour as the scales, and mixed with equally short brownish hairs which are more numerous or are better seen on two dorsal patches showing more or less clearly on each side.
