= Eriesthis =

Scientific classification
- Kingdom: Animalia
- Phylum: Arthropoda
- Class: Insecta
- Order: Coleoptera
- Suborder: Polyphaga
- Infraorder: Scarabaeiformia
- Family: Scarabaeidae
- Subfamily: Melolonthinae
- Tribe: Hopliini
- Genus: Eriesthis; Burmeister, 1844

Genus beetles

Eriesthis is a genus of beetles belonging to the family Scarabaeidae.

== Species ==
- Eriesthis aequatoria Fairmaire, 1887
- Eriesthis albofasciata Dombrow, 1997
- Eriesthis clarkei Dombrow, 1997
- Eriesthis decora Péringuey, 1902
- Eriesthis drakensbergensis Dombrow, 1997
- Eriesthis dubiosa Péringuey, 1902
- Eriesthis fallax Burmeister, 1844
- Eriesthis guttata Burmeister, 1844
- Eriesthis hessei (Schein, 1959)
- Eriesthis hypocrita Péringuey, 1902
- Eriesthis ironcrownensis Dombrow, 1997
- Eriesthis namibensis Dombrow, 2002
- Eriesthis oberprieleri Dombrow, 1997
- Eriesthis pusilla Péringuey, 1902
- Eriesthis rhodesiana Schein, 1959
- Eriesthis schoenherri Dombrow, 1997
- Eriesthis semihirta Burmeister, 1844
- Eriesthis stigmatica (Billberg, 1817)
- Eriesthis ufipana Schein, 1959
- Eriesthis vestita Burmeister, 1844
- Eriesthis vulpina Burmeister, 1844
