= Eriesthis fallax =

Scientific classification
- Kingdom: Animalia
- Phylum: Arthropoda
- Class: Insecta
- Order: Coleoptera
- Suborder: Polyphaga
- Infraorder: Scarabaeiformia
- Family: Scarabaeidae
- Genus: Eriesthis
- Species: E. fallax

Binomial name
- Eriesthis fallax Burmeister, 1844

Species of beetle

Eriesthis fallax is a species of beetle of the family Scarabaeidae. It is found in Botswana, Namibia, South Africa (Eastern Cape, Western Cape, Gauteng, North West, Free State, KwaZulu-Natal) and Zimbabwe.

== Description ==
Adults reach a length of about 6–6.5 mm (0.24–0.26 in). They are black, with the elytra chestnut-brown. The head and the sides of the pronotum are clothed with light flavescent hairs which are not so long and are appressed in the discoidal part, while along the base there is a very narrow band of light yellow scales. The scutellum is scaly. The elytra are clothed with sub-erect, short, black hairs, and have a supra-marginal band of not very dense flavescent scales ascending the posterior part of the suture, and two transverse similar bands extending across the elytra, while along the base there is also a more or less distinct band of scales. The pygidium is clothed with lemon or orange-yellow squamose hairs, which turn to white and are not so squamose on the abdomen.
