= Eriesthis ufipana =

Scientific classification
- Kingdom: Animalia
- Phylum: Arthropoda
- Class: Insecta
- Order: Coleoptera
- Suborder: Polyphaga
- Infraorder: Scarabaeiformia
- Family: Scarabaeidae
- Genus: Eriesthis
- Species: E. ufipana

Binomial name
- Eriesthis ufipana Schein, 1959

Species of beetle

Eriesthis ufipana is a species of beetle of the family Scarabaeidae. It is found in Tanzania.

== Description ==
Adults reach a length of about 6 mm (0.24 in). They are black, with black or yellowish-brown elytra and sometimes with reddish-brown antennae and fore and midlegs. They are covered with fine hair-like scales and there are long, light-colored, erect hairs on the pronotum. The propygidium, pygidium and abdomen are hairy and have whitish scales.

== Etymology ==
The species is named after its type location, the Ufipa Plateau.
