= Eriesthis albofasciata =

Scientific classification
- Kingdom: Animalia
- Phylum: Arthropoda
- Clade: Pancrustacea
- Class: Insecta
- Order: Coleoptera
- Suborder: Polyphaga
- Infraorder: Scarabaeiformia
- Family: Scarabaeidae
- Genus: Eriesthis
- Species: E. albofasciata

Binomial name
- Eriesthis albofasciata Dombrow, 1997

Species of beetle

Eriesthis albofasciata is a species of beetle of the family Scarabaeidae. It is found in Lesotho.
