= Pareriesthis bicornuta =

Scientific classification
- Kingdom: Animalia
- Phylum: Arthropoda
- Clade: Pancrustacea
- Class: Insecta
- Order: Coleoptera
- Suborder: Polyphaga
- Infraorder: Scarabaeiformia
- Family: Scarabaeidae
- Genus: Pareriesthis
- Species: P. bicornuta

Binomial name
- Pareriesthis bicornuta Moser, 1918

Species of beetle

Pareriesthis bicornuta is a species of beetle of the family Scarabaeidae. It is found in Tanzania and Angola.

== Description ==
Adults reach a length of about 8 mm (0.31 in). They are similar to Eriesthis vestita in shape and colouration. The head is covered with long yellow hairs and the pronotum has yellow setae, as well as long, erect hairs. The elytra have short, blackish-brown setae, and are covered with yellow scales along the suture and margin. The pygidial part is covered with yellow scales, while the underside has yellowish-brown hairs.
