= Eriesthis vestita =

Scientific classification
- Kingdom: Animalia
- Phylum: Arthropoda
- Class: Insecta
- Order: Coleoptera
- Suborder: Polyphaga
- Infraorder: Scarabaeiformia
- Family: Scarabaeidae
- Genus: Eriesthis
- Species: E. vestita

Binomial name
- Eriesthis vestita Burmeister, 1844

Species of beetle

Eriesthis vestita is a species of beetle of the family Scarabaeidae. It is found in South Africa (Eastern Cape, KwaZulu-Natal, North West) and Lesotho.

== Description ==
Adults reach a length of about 6.5–7 mm (0.26–0.28 in). They are black, with the elytra light fulvous. The head is clothed with short, flavescent hairs and the pronotum is covered with flavescent hairs which are somewhat long laterally, but which in the discoidal part are appressed, become somewhat squamiform towards the posterior part, and turn to scales along the base. These hairs and scales are not dense enough to hide the black background. The scutellum is densely scaly with rich yellow scales. The elytra are covered with sub-squamiform yellow hairs and the pygidium is clothed with squamose, short hairs covering the whole surface. The hairs are white on the abdomen.
