= Eriesthis guttata =

Scientific classification
- Kingdom: Animalia
- Phylum: Arthropoda
- Class: Insecta
- Order: Coleoptera
- Suborder: Polyphaga
- Infraorder: Scarabaeiformia
- Family: Scarabaeidae
- Genus: Eriesthis
- Species: E. guttata

Binomial name
- Eriesthis guttata Burmeister, 1844

Species of beetle

Eriesthis guttata is a species of beetle of the family Scarabaeidae. It is found in Eswatini, Namibia, South Africa (Eastern Cape, Northern Cape, KwaZulu-Natal, Free State, Gauteng, North West), Lesotho and Zimbabwe.

== Description ==
Adults reach a length of about 7–8.5 mm (0.28–0.33 in). They are black, with the elytra chestnut-brown. The head and pronotum are clothed with greyish hairs, and the posterior part of the pronotum has a band of sub-appressed rich yellow, somewhat squamiform hairs along the margin, interspersed with a few yellow scales. The scutellum is covered with similar hairs. The elytra are clothed with very short, black hairs, and have two transverse bands of greyish squamiform ones reaching from one side to another, but twice or three times interrupted, thus resembling spots. The pygidium is clothed with orange-yellow squamiform hairs.
