= Michaeloplia pauliani =

Scientific classification
- Kingdom: Animalia
- Phylum: Arthropoda
- Class: Insecta
- Order: Coleoptera
- Suborder: Polyphaga
- Infraorder: Scarabaeiformia
- Family: Scarabaeidae
- Genus: Michaeloplia
- Species: M. pauliani

Binomial name
- Michaeloplia pauliani Lacroix, 1997

Species of beetle

Michaeloplia pauliani is a species of beetle of the family Scarabaeidae. It is found in Madagascar.

== Description ==
Adults reach a length of about 7 mm (0.28 in). They have a rather short body. The upper surface is light yellowish-brown and is fairly densely covered with hairs. The pronotum is covered with fine scales and the head has granular punctation.
