= Michaeloplia velutina =

Scientific classification
- Kingdom: Animalia
- Phylum: Arthropoda
- Class: Insecta
- Order: Coleoptera
- Suborder: Polyphaga
- Infraorder: Scarabaeiformia
- Family: Scarabaeidae
- Genus: Michaeloplia
- Species: M. velutina

Binomial name
- Michaeloplia velutina (Fairmaire, 1897)

Synonyms
- Hoplia velutina Fairmaire, 1897

Species of beetle

Michaeloplia velutina is a species of beetle of the family Scarabaeidae. It is found in Madagascar.

== Description ==
Adults reach a length of about 8–9 mm (0.31–0.35 in). They have a massive, slightly elongated body. The upper surface is reddish-brown with irregularly distributed scales.
