= Michaeloplia opaca =

Scientific classification
- Kingdom: Animalia
- Phylum: Arthropoda
- Class: Insecta
- Order: Coleoptera
- Suborder: Polyphaga
- Infraorder: Scarabaeiformia
- Family: Scarabaeidae
- Genus: Michaeloplia
- Species: M. opaca

Binomial name
- Michaeloplia opaca Lacroix, 1997

Species of beetle

Michaeloplia opaca is a species of beetle of the family Scarabaeidae. It is found in Madagascar.

== Description ==
Adults reach a length of about 9 mm (0.35 in). They have a short, rather oval body. The upper surface is dark brown, the head has granular punctation and the elytra have elongated scales.

== Etymology ==
The species name refers to its dark colour.
