= Michaeloplia fallaciosa =

Scientific classification
- Kingdom: Animalia
- Phylum: Arthropoda
- Class: Insecta
- Order: Coleoptera
- Suborder: Polyphaga
- Infraorder: Scarabaeiformia
- Family: Scarabaeidae
- Genus: Michaeloplia
- Species: M. fallaciosa

Binomial name
- Michaeloplia fallaciosa Lacroix, 1997

Species of beetle

Michaeloplia fallaciosa is a species of beetle of the family Scarabaeidae. It is found in Madagascar.

== Description ==
Adults reach a length of about 7–8 mm (0.28–0.31 in).
