= Michaeloplia jacobusi =

Scientific classification
- Kingdom: Animalia
- Phylum: Arthropoda
- Class: Insecta
- Order: Coleoptera
- Suborder: Polyphaga
- Infraorder: Scarabaeiformia
- Family: Scarabaeidae
- Genus: Michaeloplia
- Species: M. jacobusi

Binomial name
- Michaeloplia jacobusi Lacroix, 1997

Species of beetle

Michaeloplia jacobusi is a species of beetle of the family Scarabaeidae. It is found in Madagascar.

== Description ==
Adults reach a length of about 10–11 mm (0.39–0.43 in). They are dark brown with a densely scaled upper surface. The scales on the elytra are bicolored (white and yellow) and regularly distributed. The white scales form tighter, more pronounced patterns.
