= Michaeloplia marmorata =

Scientific classification
- Kingdom: Animalia
- Phylum: Arthropoda
- Class: Insecta
- Order: Coleoptera
- Suborder: Polyphaga
- Infraorder: Scarabaeiformia
- Family: Scarabaeidae
- Genus: Michaeloplia
- Species: M. marmorata

Binomial name
- Michaeloplia marmorata Lacroix, 1997

Species of beetle

Michaeloplia marmorata is a species of beetle of the family Scarabaeidae. It is found in Madagascar.

== Description ==
Adults reach a length of about 7–7.5 mm (0.28–0.30 in). They have an elongated body. The upper surface is light brown. The scutellum and pronotum have identical scaling.
