= Michaeloplia fusca =

Scientific classification
- Kingdom: Animalia
- Phylum: Arthropoda
- Class: Insecta
- Order: Coleoptera
- Suborder: Polyphaga
- Infraorder: Scarabaeiformia
- Family: Scarabaeidae
- Genus: Michaeloplia
- Species: M. fusca

Binomial name
- Michaeloplia fusca Lacroix, 1997

Species of beetle

Michaeloplia fusca is a species of beetle of the family Scarabaeidae. It is found in Madagascar.

== Description ==
Adults reach a length of about 8–9 mm (0.31–0.35 in). They have a rather elongated body. The upper surface is dark brown with sparse hairs. The pronotum is covered with fine scales and the scutellum is slightly elongated with fine, sparse scaling.

== Etymology ==
The species name refers to its dark brown colour.
