= Michaeloplia obscura =

Scientific classification
- Kingdom: Animalia
- Phylum: Arthropoda
- Class: Insecta
- Order: Coleoptera
- Suborder: Polyphaga
- Infraorder: Scarabaeiformia
- Family: Scarabaeidae
- Genus: Michaeloplia
- Species: M. obscura

Binomial name
- Michaeloplia obscura Lacroix, 1997

Species of beetle

Michaeloplia obscura is a species of beetle of the family Scarabaeidae. It is found in Madagascar.

== Description ==
Adults reach a length of about 9–10 mm (0.35–0.39 in). They have a stout body. The upper surface is dark brown and is fairly densely covered with hairs. The pronotum is covered with scales and the head has wrinkled punctation and sparse hairs.

== Etymology ==
The species name refers to its dark colour.
