= Michaeloplia ocellata =

Scientific classification
- Kingdom: Animalia
- Phylum: Arthropoda
- Class: Insecta
- Order: Coleoptera
- Suborder: Polyphaga
- Infraorder: Scarabaeiformia
- Family: Scarabaeidae
- Genus: Michaeloplia
- Species: M. ocellata

Binomial name
- Michaeloplia ocellata Lacroix, 1997

Species of beetle

Michaeloplia ocellata is a species of beetle of the family Scarabaeidae. It is found in Madagascar.

== Description ==
Adults reach a length of about 9–10.5 mm (0.35–0.41 in). They have a slightly elongated body. The upper surface is light brown, the head has granular punctation and the elytra are covered with scales.
