= Michaeloplia griveaudi =

Scientific classification
- Kingdom: Animalia
- Phylum: Arthropoda
- Class: Insecta
- Order: Coleoptera
- Suborder: Polyphaga
- Infraorder: Scarabaeiformia
- Family: Scarabaeidae
- Genus: Michaeloplia
- Species: M. griveaudi

Binomial name
- Michaeloplia griveaudi Lacroix, 1997

Species of beetle

Michaeloplia griveaudi is a species of beetle of the family Scarabaeidae. It is found in Madagascar.

== Description ==
Adults reach a length of about 9.5–10 mm (0.37–0.39 in). They have a short and fairly broad body. They have a reddish-brown upper surface with fine scales. These scales are uniform and whitish and do not form patterns but leave small, regular, bare circles.
