= Michaeloplia plagulata =

Scientific classification
- Kingdom: Animalia
- Phylum: Arthropoda
- Class: Insecta
- Order: Coleoptera
- Suborder: Polyphaga
- Infraorder: Scarabaeiformia
- Family: Scarabaeidae
- Genus: Michaeloplia
- Species: M. plagulata

Binomial name
- Michaeloplia plagulata (Fairmaire, 1897)

Synonyms
- Hoplia plagulata Fairmaire, 1897

Species of beetle

Michaeloplia plagulata is a species of beetle of the family Scarabaeidae. It is found in Madagascar.

== Description ==
Adults reach a length of about 9–10 mm (0.35–0.39 in). They have an elongated body. The upper surface is light brown, speckled with darker brown and the elytra are covered with scales.
