= Michaeloplia lokobensis =

Scientific classification
- Kingdom: Animalia
- Phylum: Arthropoda
- Class: Insecta
- Order: Coleoptera
- Suborder: Polyphaga
- Infraorder: Scarabaeiformia
- Family: Scarabaeidae
- Genus: Michaeloplia
- Species: M. lokobensis

Binomial name
- Michaeloplia lokobensis Lacroix, 1997

Species of beetle

Michaeloplia lokobensis is a species of beetle of the family Scarabaeidae. It is found in Madagascar.

== Description ==
Adults reach a length of about 8–10 mm (0.31–0.39 in). They have a dark brown/blackish upper surface, with a fairly dense covering of hairs. The pronotum is covered with fine scales and the scutellum is also scaly.
