= Michaeloplia prolata =

Scientific classification
- Kingdom: Animalia
- Phylum: Arthropoda
- Class: Insecta
- Order: Coleoptera
- Suborder: Polyphaga
- Infraorder: Scarabaeiformia
- Family: Scarabaeidae
- Genus: Michaeloplia
- Species: M. prolata

Binomial name
- Michaeloplia prolata Lacroix, 1997

Species of beetle

Michaeloplia prolata is a species of beetle of the family Scarabaeidae. It is found in Madagascar.

== Description ==
Adults reach a length of about 7–8 mm (0.28–0.31 in). They have an elongated body. The upper surface is reddish-brown with fine, not very dense scaling. The scales on the elytra are grouped, leaving clearly visible round patches.
