= Michaeloplia montana =

Scientific classification
- Kingdom: Animalia
- Phylum: Arthropoda
- Class: Insecta
- Order: Coleoptera
- Suborder: Polyphaga
- Infraorder: Scarabaeiformia
- Family: Scarabaeidae
- Genus: Michaeloplia
- Species: M. montana

Binomial name
- Michaeloplia montana Lacroix, 1997

Species of beetle

Michaeloplia montana is a species of beetle of the family Scarabaeidae. It is found in Madagascar.

== Description ==
Adults reach a length of about 9–11 mm (0.35–0.43 in). They have a rather elongated body. The upper surface is dark brown and is fairly densely covered with hairs. The pronotum is covered with fine scales.
