= Michaeloplia ralla =

Scientific classification
- Kingdom: Animalia
- Phylum: Arthropoda
- Class: Insecta
- Order: Coleoptera
- Suborder: Polyphaga
- Infraorder: Scarabaeiformia
- Family: Scarabaeidae
- Genus: Michaeloplia
- Species: M. ralla

Binomial name
- Michaeloplia ralla Lacroix, 1997

Species of beetle

Michaeloplia ralla is a species of beetle of the family Scarabaeidae. It is found in Madagascar.

== Description ==
Adults reach a length of about 8 mm (0.31 in). They have an elongated body. The upper surface is dark reddish-brown. The head has dense, wrinkled punctation and is hairless.
