= Michaeloplia michaeli =

Scientific classification
- Kingdom: Animalia
- Phylum: Arthropoda
- Class: Insecta
- Order: Coleoptera
- Suborder: Polyphaga
- Infraorder: Scarabaeiformia
- Family: Scarabaeidae
- Genus: Michaeloplia
- Species: M. michaeli

Binomial name
- Michaeloplia michaeli Lacroix, 1997

Species of beetle

Michaeloplia michaeli is a species of beetle of the family Scarabaeidae. It is found in Madagascar.

== Description ==
Adults reach a length of about 9.5–10 mm (0.37–0.39 in). They have a rather elongated body. The upper surface is brown, ranging from light to dark. The scaling on the upper surface is spaced far apart.
