= Michaeloplia peyrierasi =

Scientific classification
- Kingdom: Animalia
- Phylum: Arthropoda
- Class: Insecta
- Order: Coleoptera
- Suborder: Polyphaga
- Infraorder: Scarabaeiformia
- Family: Scarabaeidae
- Genus: Michaeloplia
- Species: M. peyrierasi

Binomial name
- Michaeloplia peyrierasi Lacroix, 1997

Species of beetle

Michaeloplia peyrierasi is a species of beetle of the family Scarabaeidae. It is found in Madagascar.

== Description ==
Adults reach a length of about 7 mm (0.28 in). They have a not very elongated body. The upper surface is brown, but slightly reddish. The scales on the elytra are arranged in bands, without any round patches.
