= Michaeloplia tristis =

Scientific classification
- Kingdom: Animalia
- Phylum: Arthropoda
- Class: Insecta
- Order: Coleoptera
- Suborder: Polyphaga
- Infraorder: Scarabaeiformia
- Family: Scarabaeidae
- Genus: Michaeloplia
- Species: M. tristis

Binomial name
- Michaeloplia tristis Lacroix, 1997

Species of beetle

Michaeloplia tristis is a species of beetle of the family Scarabaeidae. It is found in Madagascar.

== Description ==
Adults reach a length of about 7.5–9 mm (0.30–0.35 in). They have a slender, elongated body. The upper surface is very dark brown and is sparsely covered with scales.
