= Michaeloplia =

Scientific classification
- Kingdom: Animalia
- Phylum: Arthropoda
- Class: Insecta
- Order: Coleoptera
- Suborder: Polyphaga
- Infraorder: Scarabaeiformia
- Family: Scarabaeidae
- Subfamily: Melolonthinae
- Tribe: Hopliini
- Genus: Michaeloplia; Lacroix, 1997

Genus of leaf beetles

Michaeloplia is a genus of beetles belonging to the family Scarabaeidae.

== Species ==
- Michaeloplia alboscutata Lacroix, 1997
- Michaeloplia diversa Lacroix, 1997
- Michaeloplia elongata Lacroix, 1997
- Michaeloplia fallaciosa Lacroix, 1997
- Michaeloplia fusca Lacroix, 1997
- Michaeloplia griveaudi Lacroix, 1997
- Michaeloplia jacobusi Lacroix, 1997
- Michaeloplia libita Lacroix, 1997
- Michaeloplia lokobensis Lacroix, 1997
- Michaeloplia marmorata Lacroix, 1997
- Michaeloplia michaeli Lacroix, 1997
- Michaeloplia minuta Lacroix, 1997
- Michaeloplia montana Lacroix, 1997
- Michaeloplia obscura Lacroix, 1997
- Michaeloplia ocellata Lacroix, 1997
- Michaeloplia opaca Lacroix, 1997
- Michaeloplia pauliani Lacroix, 1997
- Michaeloplia peyrierasi Lacroix, 1997
- Michaeloplia pilosa (Blanchard, 1850)
- Michaeloplia plagulata (Fairmaire, 1897)
- Michaeloplia prolata Lacroix, 1997
- Michaeloplia ralla Lacroix, 1997
- Michaeloplia tristis Lacroix, 1997
- Michaeloplia velutina (Fairmaire, 1897)
- Michaeloplia vicaria Lacroix, 1997
