= Michaeloplia pilosa =

Scientific classification
- Kingdom: Animalia
- Phylum: Arthropoda
- Class: Insecta
- Order: Coleoptera
- Suborder: Polyphaga
- Infraorder: Scarabaeiformia
- Family: Scarabaeidae
- Genus: Michaeloplia
- Species: M. pilosa

Binomial name
- Michaeloplia pilosa (Blanchard, 1850)

Synonyms
- Hoplia pilosa Blanchard, 1850

Species of beetle

Michaeloplia pilosa is a species of beetle of the family Scarabaeidae. It is found in Madagascar.

== Description ==
Adults reach a length of about 11 mm (0.43 in). They have a stout, not very elongated body. The upper surface is dark brown. There are distinctly wrinkled punctures on the head and the elytra have elongated scales.
