= Michaeloplia minuta =

Scientific classification
- Kingdom: Animalia
- Phylum: Arthropoda
- Class: Insecta
- Order: Coleoptera
- Suborder: Polyphaga
- Infraorder: Scarabaeiformia
- Family: Scarabaeidae
- Genus: Michaeloplia
- Species: M. minuta

Binomial name
- Michaeloplia minuta Lacroix, 1997

Species of beetle

Michaeloplia minuta is a species of beetle of the family Scarabaeidae. It is found in Madagascar.

== Description ==
Adults reach a length of about 7–7.5 mm (0.28–0.30 in). They have a chocolate brown upper surface covered with fine, fairly dense scales.

== Etymology ==
The species name refers to its small size compared to others in the species-group.
