= Michaeloplia libita =

Scientific classification
- Kingdom: Animalia
- Phylum: Arthropoda
- Class: Insecta
- Order: Coleoptera
- Suborder: Polyphaga
- Infraorder: Scarabaeiformia
- Family: Scarabaeidae
- Genus: Michaeloplia
- Species: M. libita

Binomial name
- Michaeloplia libita Lacroix, 1997

Species of beetle

Michaeloplia libita is a species of beetle of the family Scarabaeidae. It is found in Madagascar.

== Description ==
Adults reach a length of about 8.5 mm (0.33 in). They have an elongated body. The upper surface is light reddish-brown. The head has fine, closely spaced punctures and no hairs.
