= Paramicroplus devestivus =

Scientific classification
- Kingdom: Animalia
- Phylum: Arthropoda
- Class: Insecta
- Order: Coleoptera
- Suborder: Polyphaga
- Infraorder: Scarabaeiformia
- Family: Scarabaeidae
- Genus: Paramicroplus
- Species: P. devestivus

Binomial name
- Paramicroplus devestivus Lacroix, 1998

Species of beetle

Paramicroplus devestivus is a species of beetle of the family Scarabaeidae. It is found in Madagascar.

== Description ==
Adults reach a length of about 4–4.5 mm (0.16–0.18 in). They are similar to Paramicroplus vittatus and Paramicroplus obscurus, but the body is narrower. The upper surface is black with sparse, white, round scales.
