= Paramicroplus insignicollis =

Scientific classification
- Kingdom: Animalia
- Phylum: Arthropoda
- Class: Insecta
- Order: Coleoptera
- Suborder: Polyphaga
- Infraorder: Scarabaeiformia
- Family: Scarabaeidae
- Genus: Paramicroplus
- Species: P. insignicollis

Binomial name
- Paramicroplus insignicollis (Burmeister, 1844)

Synonyms
- Microplus insignicollis Burmeister, 1844

Species of beetle

Paramicroplus insignicollis is a species of beetle of the family Scarabaeidae. It is found in Madagascar.

== Description ==
Adults reach a length of about 3.5–4 mm (0.14–0.16 in). They are similar to Paramicroplus strigatus, but the body is less elongated. The upper surface is dark brown with oval scales.
