= Paramicroplus =

Scientific classification
- Kingdom: Animalia
- Phylum: Arthropoda
- Class: Insecta
- Order: Coleoptera
- Suborder: Polyphaga
- Infraorder: Scarabaeiformia
- Family: Scarabaeidae
- Subfamily: Melolonthinae
- Tribe: Hopliini
- Genus: Paramicroplus; Lacroix, 1998

Genus beetles

Paramicroplus is a genus of beetles belonging to the family Scarabaeidae.

== Species ==
- Paramicroplus brevis (Blanchard, 1850)
- Paramicroplus castaneus (Blanchard, 1850)
- Paramicroplus devestivus Lacroix, 1998
- Paramicroplus insignicollis (Burmeister, 1844)
- Paramicroplus keithi Vasko, 2025
- Paramicroplus obscurus Lacroix, 1998
- Paramicroplus occiduus Lacroix, 1998
- Paramicroplus strigatus (Burmeister, 1844)
- Paramicroplus vitellinus Lacroix, 1998
- Paramicroplus vittatus (Burmeister, 1844)
