= Paramicroplus occiduus =

Scientific classification
- Kingdom: Animalia
- Phylum: Arthropoda
- Class: Insecta
- Order: Coleoptera
- Suborder: Polyphaga
- Infraorder: Scarabaeiformia
- Family: Scarabaeidae
- Genus: Paramicroplus
- Species: P. occiduus

Binomial name
- Paramicroplus occiduus Lacroix, 1998

Species of beetle

Paramicroplus occiduus is a species of beetle of the family Scarabaeidae. It is found in Madagascar.

== Description ==
Adults reach a length of about 3.5–4 mm (0.14–0.16 in). They have an oval body. The upper surface is dark reddish-brown with dense punctures.
