= Paramicroplus vitellinus =

Scientific classification
- Kingdom: Animalia
- Phylum: Arthropoda
- Class: Insecta
- Order: Coleoptera
- Suborder: Polyphaga
- Infraorder: Scarabaeiformia
- Family: Scarabaeidae
- Genus: Paramicroplus
- Species: P. vitellinus

Binomial name
- Paramicroplus vitellinus Lacroix, 1998

Species of beetle

Paramicroplus vitellinus is a species of beetle of the family Scarabaeidae. It is found in Madagascar.

== Description ==
Adults reach a length of about 3.5–4 mm (0.14–0.16 in). They have a short body. The upper surface is reddish-brown with oval scales.
