= Paramicroplus keithi =

Scientific classification
- Kingdom: Animalia
- Phylum: Arthropoda
- Class: Insecta
- Order: Coleoptera
- Suborder: Polyphaga
- Infraorder: Scarabaeiformia
- Family: Scarabaeidae
- Genus: Paramicroplus
- Species: P. keithi

Binomial name
- Paramicroplus keithi Vasko, 2025

Species of beetle

Paramicroplus keithi is a species of beetle of the family Scarabaeidae. It is found in Madagascar.

== Description ==
Adults reach a length of about 4.6 mm (0.18 in). They have a short, oval, compact body. The upper surface is reddish-brown, lightly shiny and covered with yellow elongated oval scales that do not hide the background colour.

== Etymology ==
The species is dedicated to Denis Keith, a specialist in Melolonthinae of the Palaearctic and Oriental regions.
