= Paramicroplus brevis =

Scientific classification
- Kingdom: Animalia
- Phylum: Arthropoda
- Class: Insecta
- Order: Coleoptera
- Suborder: Polyphaga
- Infraorder: Scarabaeiformia
- Family: Scarabaeidae
- Genus: Paramicroplus
- Species: P. brevis

Binomial name
- Paramicroplus brevis (Blanchard, 1850)

Synonyms
- Microplus brevis Blanchard, 1850

Species of beetle

Paramicroplus brevis is a species of beetle of the family Scarabaeidae. It is found in Madagascar.

== Description ==
Adults reach a length of about 3–3.5 mm (0.12–0.14 in). They have a short body. The upper surface is brownish-orange or reddish with oval, scaly hairs.
