= Paramicroplus obscurus =

Scientific classification
- Kingdom: Animalia
- Phylum: Arthropoda
- Class: Insecta
- Order: Coleoptera
- Suborder: Polyphaga
- Infraorder: Scarabaeiformia
- Family: Scarabaeidae
- Genus: Paramicroplus
- Species: P. obscurus

Binomial name
- Paramicroplus obscurus Lacroix, 1998

Species of beetle

Paramicroplus obscurus is a species of beetle of the family Scarabaeidae. It is found in Madagascar.

== Description ==
Adults reach a length of about 4.5–5 mm (0.18–0.20 in). They are similar to Paramicroplus vittatus, but the body is more elongated. The upper surface is black with sparse, oval, scaly hairs.
