= Paramicroplus castaneus =

Scientific classification
- Kingdom: Animalia
- Phylum: Arthropoda
- Class: Insecta
- Order: Coleoptera
- Suborder: Polyphaga
- Infraorder: Scarabaeiformia
- Family: Scarabaeidae
- Genus: Paramicroplus
- Species: P. castaneus

Binomial name
- Paramicroplus castaneus (Blanchard, 1850)

Synonyms
- Microplus castanea Blanchard, 1850

Species of beetle

Paramicroplus castaneus is a species of beetle of the family Scarabaeidae. It is found in Madagascar.

== Description ==
Adults reach a length of about 4–4.5 mm (0.16–0.18 in). They have a short body. The upper surface is reddish-brown with yellow, strong, and rounded scales.
