= Paramicroplus strigatus =

Scientific classification
- Kingdom: Animalia
- Phylum: Arthropoda
- Class: Insecta
- Order: Coleoptera
- Suborder: Polyphaga
- Infraorder: Scarabaeiformia
- Family: Scarabaeidae
- Genus: Paramicroplus
- Species: P. strigatus

Binomial name
- Paramicroplus strigatus (Burmeister, 1844)

Synonyms
- Microplus strigatus Burmeister, 1844

Species of beetle

Paramicroplus strigatus is a species of beetle of the family Scarabaeidae. It is found in Madagascar.

== Description ==
Adults reach a length of about 4–4.5 mm (0.16–0.18 in). They have a rather elongated body. The upper surface is reddish-brown with oval scales.
