= Paramicroplus vittatus =

Scientific classification
- Kingdom: Animalia
- Phylum: Arthropoda
- Class: Insecta
- Order: Coleoptera
- Suborder: Polyphaga
- Infraorder: Scarabaeiformia
- Family: Scarabaeidae
- Genus: Paramicroplus
- Species: P. vittatus

Binomial name
- Paramicroplus vittatus (Burmeister, 1844)

Synonyms
- Microplus vittatus Burmeister, 1844

Species of beetle

Paramicroplus vittatus is a species of beetle of the family Scarabaeidae. It is found in Madagascar.

== Description ==
Adults reach a length of about 3.5–4.5 mm (0.14–0.18 in). They have a short body. The upper surface is black with white, round, scaly hairs.
