= Diaplochelus squamulatus =

Scientific classification
- Kingdom: Animalia
- Phylum: Arthropoda
- Clade: Pancrustacea
- Class: Insecta
- Order: Coleoptera
- Suborder: Polyphaga
- Infraorder: Scarabaeiformia
- Family: Scarabaeidae
- Genus: Diaplochelus
- Species: D. squamulatus

Binomial name
- Diaplochelus squamulatus Burmeister, 1844

Synonyms
- Diaplochelus transvaalensis Péringuey, 1902; Diaplochelus squamulatus castaneus Burmeister, 1844; Diaplochelus squamulatus maculicollis Burmeister, 1844; Diaplochelus squamulatus rufipes Burmeister, 1844

Species of beetle

Diaplochelus squamulatus is a species of beetle of the family Scarabaeidae. It is found in South Africa (Gauteng, Western Cape).

== Description ==
Adults reach a length of about 5.5–7 mm (0.22–0.28 in). They are similar to Diaplochelus longipes, from which it differs mainly by the shape of the hind tibia of the male. The head is black, while the pronotum, legs, and under side are reddish, and the elytra are brick-red. The sides of the pronotum are much more numerously punctate, and the pubescence on the sides is therefore denser. The elytra are more roughly and numerously punctured between the two costules, which are very distinct, and the punctures each bear a minute sub-flavescent scale. The pygidium and also the propygidium have small, ovate, flavescent scales.

== Taxonomy ==
Péringuey treated Diaplochelus squamulatus as a synonym, but in the same work described the same species as a new valid species (Diaplochelus transvaalensis). A probable explanation is that in his description of squamulatus, Burmeister did not mention the characteristic saw teeth on the lower edge of the hind tibiae.
