= Diaplochelus =

Scientific classification
- Kingdom: Animalia
- Phylum: Arthropoda
- Class: Insecta
- Order: Coleoptera
- Suborder: Polyphaga
- Infraorder: Scarabaeiformia
- Family: Scarabaeidae
- Subfamily: Melolonthinae
- Tribe: Hopliini
- Genus: Diaplochelus; Burmeister, 1844

Genus beetles

Diaplochelus is a genus of beetles belonging to the family Scarabaeidae.

== Species ==
- Diaplochelus crassipes Burmeister, 1844
- Diaplochelus karnkowskii Dombrow, 2006
- Diaplochelus longipes (Fabricius, 1787)
- Diaplochelus olseni Dombrow, 2006
- Diaplochelus squamulatus Burmeister, 1844

== Selected former species ==
- Diaplochelus transvaalensis Péringuey, 1902
