= Diaplochelus crassipes =

Scientific classification
- Kingdom: Animalia
- Phylum: Arthropoda
- Class: Insecta
- Order: Coleoptera
- Suborder: Polyphaga
- Infraorder: Scarabaeiformia
- Family: Scarabaeidae
- Genus: Diaplochelus
- Species: D. crassipes

Binomial name
- Diaplochelus crassipes Burmeister, 1844

Species of beetle

Diaplochelus crassipes is a species of beetle of the family Scarabaeidae. It is found in South Africa (Western Cape).

== Description ==
Adults reach a length of about 8–10 mm (0.31–0.39 in). Males are black, with the elytra pale testaceous or testaceous red, and the legs rufescent, but occasionally the elytra and legs are black. The head, pronotum and legs are clothed with a very dense fulvous pubescence, while the scutellum is covered with greyish or slightly flavescent scales which form also a marginal band on the elytra, this band ascends a little along the suture. Females are similar to males, but the elytra are more distinctly striate, and the punctures more numerous, the lateral and apical marginal bands of scales are narrower, and the scales less dense and a little more hair-like.
