= Diaplochelus olseni =

Scientific classification
- Kingdom: Animalia
- Phylum: Arthropoda
- Clade: Pancrustacea
- Class: Insecta
- Order: Coleoptera
- Suborder: Polyphaga
- Infraorder: Scarabaeiformia
- Family: Scarabaeidae
- Genus: Diaplochelus
- Species: D. olseni

Binomial name
- Diaplochelus olseni Dombrow, 2006

Species of beetle

Diaplochelus olseni is a species of beetle of the family Scarabaeidae. It is found in South Africa (Northern Cape).
