= Diaplochelus longipes =

Scientific classification
- Kingdom: Animalia
- Phylum: Arthropoda
- Clade: Pancrustacea
- Class: Insecta
- Order: Coleoptera
- Suborder: Polyphaga
- Infraorder: Scarabaeiformia
- Family: Scarabaeidae
- Genus: Diaplochelus
- Species: D. longipes

Binomial name
- Diaplochelus longipes (Fabricius, 1787)

Synonyms
- Melolontha longipes Fabricius, 1787

Species of beetle

Diaplochelus longipes is a species of beetle of the family Scarabaeidae. It is found in the Democratic Republic of the Congo and South Africa (Western Cape).

== Description ==
Adults reach a length of about 5.5–7 mm (0.22–0.28 in). Males are black, with the elytra pale testaceous and shining, and the legs and abdomen reddish. The antennae are pale rufescent and the head is deeply and closely punctured but not scabrose, covered with somewhat sparse, short erect hairs, and having a lateral fringe of long setae. The pronotum is sparsely punctured, the punctures deep and bearing each a very short hair. The scutellum has a few scales and the elytra are sparsely and deeply punctate, densely scaly or only sparsely so. The propygidium has a few elongate scales, while the pygidium glabrous, but thickly fringed at the apex with villose hairs. Females are similar to males, but the hind legs are more slender, the hind tibiae are simple, and they have a long apical spur.
