= Kubousa venusta =

Scientific classification
- Kingdom: Animalia
- Phylum: Arthropoda
- Class: Insecta
- Order: Coleoptera
- Suborder: Polyphaga
- Infraorder: Scarabaeiformia
- Family: Scarabaeidae
- Genus: Kubousa
- Species: K. venusta

Binomial name
- Kubousa venusta Péringuey, 1902

Species of beetle

Kubousa venusta is a species of beetle of the family Scarabaeidae. It is found in South Africa (Cape).

== Description ==
Adults reach a length of about 3.5–4.5 mm (0.14–0.18 in). Males are very similar to Kubousa axillaris, but differs in the less elongated shape of the body, which is a little broader in proportion to the length. The pronotum, instead of being opaque and very finely aciculate, is shining and either impunctate or has only a few scattered punctures in the discoidal part. The elytra are also more shiny and less closely punctate, the sub-basal red patch is often less plainly visible, and the round scales on the pygidium are bright yellow. Females have the shape of the males, but the pronotum is more punctate, and the elytra are red, but have a broad, basal, black band.
