= Kubousa gentilis =

Scientific classification
- Kingdom: Animalia
- Phylum: Arthropoda
- Class: Insecta
- Order: Coleoptera
- Suborder: Polyphaga
- Infraorder: Scarabaeiformia
- Family: Scarabaeidae
- Genus: Kubousa
- Species: K. gentilis

Binomial name
- Kubousa gentilis Péringuey, 1902

Species of beetle

Kubousa gentilis is a species of beetle of the family Scarabaeidae. It is found in South Africa (Cape).

== Description ==
Adults reach a length of about 4.5 mm (0.18 in). Males are aeneous black, with the elytra somewhat brownish red in the anterior part, covered with small, elongate, white scales on the pronotum, and also on the elytra. The pygidial part of the abdomen is covered with similar scales which are contiguous. The scutellum has a few scales.
