= Kubousa elegans =

Scientific classification
- Kingdom: Animalia
- Phylum: Arthropoda
- Class: Insecta
- Order: Coleoptera
- Suborder: Polyphaga
- Infraorder: Scarabaeiformia
- Family: Scarabaeidae
- Genus: Kubousa
- Species: K. elegans

Binomial name
- Kubousa elegans Péringuey, 1902

Species of beetle

Kubousa elegans is a species of beetle of the family Scarabaeidae. It is found in South Africa (Cape).

== Description ==
Adults reach a length of about 3.5–5 mm (0.14–0.20 in). Males are black, with the tarsi rufescent, covered on the upper side with small and dense but not quite contiguous greyish white slightly hair-like scales, and on the pygidial part and abdomen with thicker and broader silvery-white ones. The scales on the elytra are denser than on the pronotum, but not quite contiguous. The elytra are very faintly costulate on each side, and they have a distinct longitudinal basal impression along the humeral callus. Females are similar to males in size, shape, and vestiture, but the scales are a little more flavescent, and those on the pygidium a little more hair-like.
