= Kubousa =

Scientific classification
- Kingdom: Animalia
- Phylum: Arthropoda
- Class: Insecta
- Order: Coleoptera
- Suborder: Polyphaga
- Infraorder: Scarabaeiformia
- Family: Scarabaeidae
- Subfamily: Melolonthinae
- Tribe: Hopliini
- Genus: Kubousa; Péringuey, 1902

Genus beetles

Kubousa is a genus of beetles belonging to the family Scarabaeidae.

== Species ==
- Kubousa antennata Dombrow, 2007
- Kubousa axillaris (Burmeister, 1844)
- Kubousa colvillei Dombrow, 2007
- Kubousa elegans Péringuey, 1902
- Kubousa elkiana Dombrow, 2007
- Kubousa gentilis Péringuey, 1902
- Kubousa nikolaji Dombrow, 2007
- Kubousa robertsoni Dombrow, 2007
- Kubousa venusta Péringuey, 1902
- Kubousa zawari Dombrow, 2007
