= Kubousa axillaris =

Scientific classification
- Kingdom: Animalia
- Phylum: Arthropoda
- Class: Insecta
- Order: Coleoptera
- Suborder: Polyphaga
- Infraorder: Scarabaeiformia
- Family: Scarabaeidae
- Genus: Kubousa
- Species: K. axillaris

Binomial name
- Kubousa axillaris (Burmeister, 1844)

Synonyms
- Platychelus axillaris Burmeister, 1844

Species of beetle

Kubousa axillaris is a species of beetle of the family Scarabaeidae. It is found in South Africa (Western Cape, Northern Cape).

== Description ==
Adults reach a length of about 4.5–5 mm (0.18–0.20 in). Males are black and shining, with the elytra transversely rufescent in the median part, along the suture of the elytra are a few sparse, whitish scales, and the vertical pygidium is covered with round, nearly contiguous, flavescent scales. The propygidium and the edges of the abdominal segments have elongated, somewhat appressed, hair-like, white scales. The head is scabrose and pubescent. The pronotum is shining and has some remotely scattered punctures, fringed with somewhat stiff ciliate hairs along the anterior and lateral margins, and having along the base and also the posterior part of the lateral margin a very narrow band of white, elongate scales. The elytra are shining, irregularly punctured and have in the punctures some white hair-like scales which are more regularly disposed along the suture, although not forming a band. Females are similar to males, but the two angles of the apical part of the clypeus are not quite as much reflexed, the elytra are testaceous red from a small distance from the base right to the apex, and the legs are reddish.
