= Pseudomicroplus rugosus =

Scientific classification
- Kingdom: Animalia
- Phylum: Arthropoda
- Class: Insecta
- Order: Coleoptera
- Suborder: Polyphaga
- Infraorder: Scarabaeiformia
- Family: Scarabaeidae
- Genus: Pseudomicroplus
- Species: P. rugosus

Binomial name
- Pseudomicroplus rugosus (Blanchard, 1850)

Synonyms
- Microplus rugosa Blanchard, 1850

Species of beetle

Pseudomicroplus rugosus is a species of beetle of the family Scarabaeidae. It is found in Madagascar.

== Description ==
Adults reach a length of about 4.5 mm (0.18 in). They have a short, oval body. The upper surface is blackish-brown with fine, sparse hairs.
