= Pseudomicroplus =

Scientific classification
- Kingdom: Animalia
- Phylum: Arthropoda
- Class: Insecta
- Order: Coleoptera
- Suborder: Polyphaga
- Infraorder: Scarabaeiformia
- Family: Scarabaeidae
- Subfamily: Melolonthinae
- Tribe: Hopliini
- Genus: Pseudomicroplus; Lacroix, 1998

Genus beetles

Pseudomicroplus is a genus of beetles belonging to the family Scarabaeidae.

== Species ==
- Pseudomicroplus aquilus Lacroix, 1998
- Pseudomicroplus brunneus Lacroix, 1998
- Pseudomicroplus canutus Lacroix, 1998
- Pseudomicroplus costatus Lacroix, 1998
- Pseudomicroplus rugosus (Blanchard, 1850)
- Pseudomicroplus vieui Lacroix, 1998
