= Pseudomicroplus aquilus =

Scientific classification
- Kingdom: Animalia
- Phylum: Arthropoda
- Class: Insecta
- Order: Coleoptera
- Suborder: Polyphaga
- Infraorder: Scarabaeiformia
- Family: Scarabaeidae
- Genus: Pseudomicroplus
- Species: P. aquilus

Binomial name
- Pseudomicroplus aquilus Lacroix, 1998

Species of beetle

Pseudomicroplus aquilus is a species of beetle of the family Scarabaeidae. It is found in Madagascar.

== Description ==
Adults reach a length of about 4.5–5 mm (0.18–0.20 in). They have a rather narrow body. The upper surface is deep black with no or hardly visible hairs.
