= Pseudomicroplus canutus =

Scientific classification
- Kingdom: Animalia
- Phylum: Arthropoda
- Class: Insecta
- Order: Coleoptera
- Suborder: Polyphaga
- Infraorder: Scarabaeiformia
- Family: Scarabaeidae
- Genus: Pseudomicroplus
- Species: P. canutus

Binomial name
- Pseudomicroplus canutus Lacroix, 1998

Species of beetle

Pseudomicroplus canutus is a species of beetle of the family Scarabaeidae. It is found in Madagascar.

== Description ==
Adults reach a length of about 4.5–5 mm (0.18–0.20 in). They have a narrow body. The upper surface is dark brown with dense, non-aligned hairs.
