= Mitrophorus morio =

Scientific classification
- Kingdom: Animalia
- Phylum: Arthropoda
- Class: Insecta
- Order: Coleoptera
- Suborder: Polyphaga
- Infraorder: Scarabaeiformia
- Family: Scarabaeidae
- Genus: Mitrophorus
- Species: M. morio

Binomial name
- Mitrophorus morio Burmeister, 1855

Species of beetle

Mitrophorus morio is a species of beetle of the family Scarabaeidae. It is found in South Africa (Eastern Cape).

== Description ==
Adults reach a length of about 6 mm (0.24 in). They are similar to Mitrophorus leucophaea, but smaller. They are black, somewhat shining and without scales, as well as transversely scabroso-punctate all over, and with a black flat bristle in each puncture, those along the margin are longer, broader, and project like cilia.
