= Mitrophorus =

Scientific classification
- Kingdom: Animalia
- Phylum: Arthropoda
- Class: Insecta
- Order: Coleoptera
- Suborder: Polyphaga
- Infraorder: Scarabaeiformia
- Family: Scarabaeidae
- Subfamily: Melolonthinae
- Tribe: Hopliini
- Genus: Mitrophorus; Burmeister, 1844

Genus of leaf beetles

Mitrophorus is a genus of beetles belonging to the family Scarabaeidae.

== Species ==
- Mitrophorus leucophaea (Blanchard, 1850)
- Mitrophorus morio Burmeister, 1855
- Mitrophorus natalensis Péringuey, 1902
- Mitrophorus transvaalensis Péringuey, 1902
