= Mitrophorus natalensis =

Scientific classification
- Kingdom: Animalia
- Phylum: Arthropoda
- Class: Insecta
- Order: Coleoptera
- Suborder: Polyphaga
- Infraorder: Scarabaeiformia
- Family: Scarabaeidae
- Genus: Mitrophorus
- Species: M. natalensis

Binomial name
- Mitrophorus natalensis Péringuey, 1902

Species of beetle

Mitrophorus natalensis is a species of beetle of the family Scarabaeidae. It is found in South Africa (KwaZulu-Natal).

== Description ==
Adults reach a length of about 6.5 mm (0.26 in). They are black, with the head closely scabrose, and clothed with moderately short, dense, sub-flavescent hairs. The pronotum is very closely scabroso-punctate and clothed with a villose, somewhat short, sub-flavescent pubescence. The elytra are fuscous brown, covered with appressed hair-like flavescent scales, denser in the posterior part along the suture and the apical margin. The edge of the propygidium, the pygidium and abdomen are clothed with appressed squamiform flavescent hairs.
