= Mitrophorus transvaalensis =

Scientific classification
- Kingdom: Animalia
- Phylum: Arthropoda
- Class: Insecta
- Order: Coleoptera
- Suborder: Polyphaga
- Infraorder: Scarabaeiformia
- Family: Scarabaeidae
- Genus: Mitrophorus
- Species: M. transvaalensis

Binomial name
- Mitrophorus transvaalensis Péringuey, 1902

Species of beetle

Mitrophorus transvaalensis is a species of beetle of the family Scarabaeidae. It is found in South Africa (North West).

== Description ==
Adults reach a length of about 7 mm (0.28 in). They are black and moderately shining. The head is very rugose and the pronotum is deeply but not closely punctate, except on the sides where the punctures are somewhat scabrose, and clothed with a moderately dense sub-flavescent pubescence. The elytra are distinctly bi-costulate on each side and covered with appressed and sub-appressed greyish hairs. The propygidium and pygidium are covered with similar hairs, which are however shorter and more squamiform.
