= Mitrophorus leucophaea =

Scientific classification
- Kingdom: Animalia
- Phylum: Arthropoda
- Class: Insecta
- Order: Coleoptera
- Suborder: Polyphaga
- Infraorder: Scarabaeiformia
- Family: Scarabaeidae
- Genus: Mitrophorus
- Species: M. leucophaea

Binomial name
- Mitrophorus leucophaea (Blanchard, 1850)

Synonyms
- Gymnoloma leucophaea Blanchard, 1850; Mitrophorus ateuchoides Burmeister, 1844

Species of beetle

Mitrophorus leucophaea is a species of beetle of the family Scarabaeidae. It is found in South Africa (Western Cape).

== Description ==
Adults reach a length of about 7 mm (0.28 in). They are black, with the scutellum, elytra, the pygidial part and the abdomen entirely covered with minute contiguous flavous or sulphur-yellow scales. The pronotum is also covered with appressed sub-squamose hairs, as well as with a flavescent pubescence, and along the base there is a broad band of scales. The head is pubescent and rugose. The elytra are elongate, sub-rufescent, sub-cylindrical, not emarginate laterally and bi-costulate on each side.
