= Cylichnus neglectus =

Scientific classification
- Kingdom: Animalia
- Phylum: Arthropoda
- Class: Insecta
- Order: Coleoptera
- Suborder: Polyphaga
- Infraorder: Scarabaeiformia
- Family: Scarabaeidae
- Genus: Cylichnus
- Species: C. neglectus

Binomial name
- Cylichnus neglectus Péringuey, 1902

Species of beetle

Cylichnus neglectus is a species of beetle of the family Scarabaeidae. It is found in South Africa (North West).

== Description ==
Adults reach a length of about 8 mm (0.31 in). They are testaceous brown, covered with very fine, minute, sub-flavescent hairs not set sufficiently close to each other to form a pubescence on the upper side. The shape and sculpture of the head and clypeus are similar to that of Cylichnus pilosulus. The pronotum is covered with nearly confluent punctures separated by irregular, not scabrose walls. The elytra, including the greatest part of the suture, are pluri-costulate and covered with nearly contiguous punctures, the irregular walls of which make the surface appear shagreened, and each puncture bears a minute appressed sub-flavescent hair. The pygidium is briefly pubescent all round, but has on the surface hairs similar to those on the elytra, and those on the underside, especially on the abdomen, are alike.
