= Cylichnus vanus =

Scientific classification
- Kingdom: Animalia
- Phylum: Arthropoda
- Class: Insecta
- Order: Coleoptera
- Suborder: Polyphaga
- Infraorder: Scarabaeiformia
- Family: Scarabaeidae
- Genus: Cylichnus
- Species: C. vanus

Binomial name
- Cylichnus vanus Péringuey, 1902

Species of beetle

Cylichnus vanus is a species of beetle of the family Scarabaeidae. It is found in South Africa (Eastern Cape).

== Description ==
Adults reach a length of about 9 mm (0.35 in). Males have a black head, with the clypeus slightly brown and the pronotum and elytra chestnut-brown, but with the median anterior part of the former a little infuscate. Both the head and clypeus are equally shagreened and the pronotum is very finely punctured, the punctures are very dense, and among them are some large ones bearing each a very short, appressed greyish hair. The pronotum have hardly any punctures. The elytra are plainly bi-costate on each side, but also have a less well-defined third discoidal costule, the suture is raised, and it is covered by very closely set punctures bearing each a minute greyish flavescent appressed hair. The pygidium and abdomen have similar hairs which are not, however, so closely set. The legs are testaceous. Females are very different from the males. They are reddish-brown all over, and the pronotum has much more numerous cicatricose punctures and the elytra are covered with broad very closely set punctures having a smaller one in the centre, these punctures are more cicatricose in the anterior than in the posterior part, the appressed hairs are considerably less dense and are finer.
