= Cylichnus =

Scientific classification
- Kingdom: Animalia
- Phylum: Arthropoda
- Class: Insecta
- Order: Coleoptera
- Suborder: Polyphaga
- Infraorder: Scarabaeiformia
- Family: Scarabaeidae
- Subfamily: Melolonthinae
- Tribe: Hopliini
- Genus: Cylichnus; Burmeister, 1844

Genus of leaf beetles

Cylichnus is a genus of beetles belonging to the family Scarabaeidae.

== Species ==
- Cylichnus neglectus Péringuey, 1902
- Cylichnus pilosulus Burmeister, 1844
- Cylichnus vanus Péringuey, 1902
