= Cylichnus pilosulus =

Scientific classification
- Kingdom: Animalia
- Phylum: Arthropoda
- Class: Insecta
- Order: Coleoptera
- Suborder: Polyphaga
- Infraorder: Scarabaeiformia
- Family: Scarabaeidae
- Genus: Cylichnus
- Species: C. pilosulus

Binomial name
- Cylichnus pilosulus Burmeister, 1844

Species of beetle

Cylichnus pilosulus is a species of beetle of the family Scarabaeidae. It is found in South Africa (Cape).

== Description ==
Adults reach a length of about 7.5 mm (0.30 in). The head and pronotum are black, while the elytra and underside are chestnut-brown and the legs testaceous. The head is very rugose and the clypeus is covered (like the head) with a sub-flavescent pubescence. The pronotum is granulose and set with long, sub-appressed, sub-flavescent hairs. The elytra are pluri-costate on each side, but the costae not very plain, covered with transverse, closely set, somewhat irregular scar-like impressions, and clothed with dense sub-erect greyish hairs. The underside and legs are finely pubescent.
