= Eulaiades femoralis =

Scientific classification
- Kingdom: Animalia
- Phylum: Arthropoda
- Class: Insecta
- Order: Coleoptera
- Suborder: Polyphaga
- Infraorder: Scarabaeiformia
- Family: Scarabaeidae
- Genus: Eulaiades
- Species: E. femoralis

Binomial name
- Eulaiades femoralis (Blanchard, 1850)

Synonyms
- Dicentrines femoralis Blanchard, 1850

Species of beetle

Eulaiades femoralis is a species of beetle of the family Scarabaeidae. It is found in Madagascar.

== Description ==
Adults reach a length of about 6 mm (0.24 in). Their body is less broad and more elongated than that of Eulaiades inflatipes, Eulaiades latipennis and Eulaiades sicardi. The upper surface is light brown with fine but fairly dense hairs.
