= Eulaiades steineri =

Scientific classification
- Kingdom: Animalia
- Phylum: Arthropoda
- Class: Insecta
- Order: Coleoptera
- Suborder: Polyphaga
- Infraorder: Scarabaeiformia
- Family: Scarabaeidae
- Genus: Eulaiades
- Species: E. steineri

Binomial name
- Eulaiades steineri Lacroix, 1997

Species of beetle

Eulaiades steineri is a species of beetle of the family Scarabaeidae. It is found in Madagascar.

== Description ==
Adults reach a length of about 7 mm (0.28 in). They have a short, stocky body. The upper surface is dark brown with dense scaly hairs.
