= Eulaiades =

Scientific classification
- Kingdom: Animalia
- Phylum: Arthropoda
- Class: Insecta
- Order: Coleoptera
- Suborder: Polyphaga
- Infraorder: Scarabaeiformia
- Family: Scarabaeidae
- Subfamily: Melolonthinae
- Tribe: Hopliini
- Genus: Eulaiades; Fairmaire, 1899

Genus of leaf beetles

Eulaiades is a genus of beetles belonging to the family Scarabaeidae.

== Species ==
- Eulaiades femoralis (Blanchard, 1850)
- Eulaiades inflatipes Fairmaire, 1899
- Eulaiades latipennis (Fairmaire, 1898)
- Eulaiades sicardi Lacroix, 1997
- Eulaiades steineri Lacroix, 1997
