= Eulaiades inflatipes =

Scientific classification
- Kingdom: Animalia
- Phylum: Arthropoda
- Class: Insecta
- Order: Coleoptera
- Suborder: Polyphaga
- Infraorder: Scarabaeiformia
- Family: Scarabaeidae
- Genus: Eulaiades
- Species: E. inflatipes

Binomial name
- Eulaiades inflatipes Fairmaire, 1899

Species of beetle

Eulaiades inflatipes is a species of beetle of the family Scarabaeidae. It is found in Madagascar.

== Description ==
Adults reach a length of about 7–9 mm (0.28–0.35 in). They have a short, stocky body. The upper surface is brownish-orange with dense hairs.
