= Eulaiades latipennis =

Scientific classification
- Kingdom: Animalia
- Phylum: Arthropoda
- Class: Insecta
- Order: Coleoptera
- Suborder: Polyphaga
- Infraorder: Scarabaeiformia
- Family: Scarabaeidae
- Genus: Eulaiades
- Species: E. latipennis

Binomial name
- Eulaiades latipennis (Fairmaire, 1898)

Synonyms
- Hoplia latipennis Fairmaire, 1898; Hoplia anticipes Fairmaire, 1901

Species of beetle

Eulaiades latipennis is a species of beetle of the family Scarabaeidae. It is found in Madagascar.

== Description ==
Adults reach a length of about 6–7 mm (0.24–0.28 in). They have a short, oval body. The upper surface is brownish-yellow with very fine, sparse hairs.
