= Delphinobius lebbei =

Scientific classification
- Kingdom: Animalia
- Phylum: Arthropoda
- Class: Insecta
- Order: Coleoptera
- Suborder: Polyphaga
- Infraorder: Scarabaeiformia
- Family: Scarabaeidae
- Genus: Delphinobius
- Species: D. lebbei

Binomial name
- Delphinobius lebbei Lacroix, 1998

Species of beetle

Delphinobius lebbei is a species of beetle of the family Scarabaeidae. It is found in Madagascar.

== Description ==
Adults reach a length of about 6–7 mm (0.24–0.28 in). They are very similar to Delphinobius rugicollis. The punctation on the pronotum is dense and strong and the hairs on the upper surface are clearly visible.
