= Delphinobius =

Scientific classification
- Kingdom: Animalia
- Phylum: Arthropoda
- Class: Insecta
- Order: Coleoptera
- Suborder: Polyphaga
- Infraorder: Scarabaeiformia
- Family: Scarabaeidae
- Subfamily: Melolonthinae
- Tribe: Hopliini
- Genus: Delphinobius; Fairmaire, 1900

Genus beetles

Delphinobius is a genus of beetles belonging to the family Scarabaeidae.

== Species ==
- Delphinobius cottai Fairmaire, 1900
- Delphinobius lebbei Lacroix, 1998
- Delphinobius luctuosus (Blanchard, 1850)
- Delphinobius rugicollis (Fairmaire, 1901)
- Delphinobius vespertinus Lacroix, 1998
