= Delphinobius luctuosus =

Scientific classification
- Kingdom: Animalia
- Phylum: Arthropoda
- Class: Insecta
- Order: Coleoptera
- Suborder: Polyphaga
- Infraorder: Scarabaeiformia
- Family: Scarabaeidae
- Genus: Delphinobius
- Species: D. luctuosus

Binomial name
- Delphinobius luctuosus (Blanchard, 1850)

Synonyms
- Hoplia luctuosa Blanchard, 1850

Species of beetle

Delphinobius luctuosus is a species of beetle of the family Scarabaeidae. It is found in Madagascar.

== Description ==
Adults reach a length of about 5–6.5 mm (0.20–0.26 in). They have a short, oval body. The upper surface is blackish-brown with very fine, sparse hairs.
