= Delphinobius vespertinus =

Scientific classification
- Kingdom: Animalia
- Phylum: Arthropoda
- Class: Insecta
- Order: Coleoptera
- Suborder: Polyphaga
- Infraorder: Scarabaeiformia
- Family: Scarabaeidae
- Genus: Delphinobius
- Species: D. vespertinus

Binomial name
- Delphinobius vespertinus Lacroix, 1998

Species of beetle

Delphinobius vespertinus is a species of beetle of the family Scarabaeidae. It is found in Madagascar.

== Description ==
Adults reach a length of about 6.5 mm (0.26 in). They have a slightly elongated body. The upper surface is reddish-brown with fine hairs.
