= Delphinobius cottai =

Scientific classification
- Kingdom: Animalia
- Phylum: Arthropoda
- Class: Insecta
- Order: Coleoptera
- Suborder: Polyphaga
- Infraorder: Scarabaeiformia
- Family: Scarabaeidae
- Genus: Delphinobius
- Species: D. cottai

Binomial name
- Delphinobius cottai Fairmaire, 1900

Species of beetle

Delphinobius cottai is a species of beetle of the family Scarabaeidae. It is found in Madagascar.

== Description ==
Adults reach a length of about 6–8 mm (0.24–0.31 in). They have a short, oval body. The upper surface is shiny reddish-brown with virtually no hairs.
