= Delphinobius rugicollis =

Scientific classification
- Kingdom: Animalia
- Phylum: Arthropoda
- Class: Insecta
- Order: Coleoptera
- Suborder: Polyphaga
- Infraorder: Scarabaeiformia
- Family: Scarabaeidae
- Genus: Delphinobius
- Species: D. rugicollis

Binomial name
- Delphinobius rugicollis (Fairmaire, 1901)

Synonyms
- Hoplia rugicollis Fairmaire, 1901

Species of beetle

Delphinobius rugicollis is a species of beetle of the family Scarabaeidae. It is found in Madagascar.

== Description ==
Adults reach a length of about 6–7 mm (0.24–0.28 in). They have a massive body. The upper surface is reddish-brown with short, fine hairs.
