= Anisochelus neglectus =

Scientific classification
- Kingdom: Animalia
- Phylum: Arthropoda
- Class: Insecta
- Order: Coleoptera
- Suborder: Polyphaga
- Infraorder: Scarabaeiformia
- Family: Scarabaeidae
- Genus: Anisochelus
- Species: A. neglectus

Binomial name
- Anisochelus neglectus Burmeister, 1844

Species of beetle

Anisochelus neglectus is a species of beetle of the family Scarabaeidae. It is found in South Africa (Western Cape).

== Description ==
Adults reach a length of about 5–5.25 mm (0.197–0.207 in). The head and pronotum are nearly black but with an aeneous sheen, which is also found on the legs and underside. The elytra are light chestnut-brown. The head and pronotum are very rugose and clothed with a dense, long, sub-appressed flavescent pubescence mixed with erect setae, the latter being denser in the anterior part and also along the outer margins. The elytra are covered with dense appressed flavescent hairs and a few erect setae in the basal part. The propygidium and pygidium are clothed with dense, long, appressed flavous hairs. The legs are hairy.
