= Anisochelus inornatus =

Scientific classification
- Kingdom: Animalia
- Phylum: Arthropoda
- Class: Insecta
- Order: Coleoptera
- Suborder: Polyphaga
- Infraorder: Scarabaeiformia
- Family: Scarabaeidae
- Genus: Anisochelus
- Species: A. inornatus

Binomial name
- Anisochelus inornatus Burmeister, 1844

Species of beetle

Anisochelus inornatus is a species of beetle of the family Scarabaeidae. It is found in South Africa (Cape).

== Description ==
Adults reach a length of about 6 mm (0.24 in). Males are black, with the elytra testaceous and having a broad lateral fuscous border. The head is very rugose and the head and pronotum are clothed with very long, erect black hairs. The scutellum is briefly pubescent. The elytra have very short, sub-appressed black hairs, not dense enough to form a pubescence, and long black setae moderately scattered but more numerous on the shoulders and in the anterior part. The pygidium is villose and has a conspicuous transverse band of appressed white silky hairs along the base, while the other villose hairs are black. The abdomen is clothed with a greyish pubescence. Females have the same shape and size as the males, but the elytra are also covered with dense, appressed greyish hairs and the pygidium has a transverse band of greyish hairs along the base and at the apex. Furthermore, the hairs and the pubescence underneath are a little more flavescent.
