= Anisochelus hilaris =

Scientific classification
- Kingdom: Animalia
- Phylum: Arthropoda
- Class: Insecta
- Order: Coleoptera
- Suborder: Polyphaga
- Infraorder: Scarabaeiformia
- Family: Scarabaeidae
- Genus: Anisochelus
- Species: A. hilaris

Binomial name
- Anisochelus hilaris Burmeister, 1844

Species of beetle

Anisochelus hilaris is a species of beetle of the family Scarabaeidae. It is found in South Africa (Cape).

== Description ==
Adults reach a length of about 5 mm (0.20 in). The head is black, densely punctured, but nevertheless shiny. The frontal part and vertex of the head have brown hairs. The scutellum is black and the elytra are pale chestnut-brown, shiny, coarsely punctate, and clothed with hairs of unequal length between which long hairs occur at the suture and on the shoulders. The lateral margins and sides as well as the ventral surface of the abdomen, sternum and legs have long, equal hairs. Underneath, these hairs are whitish but on the tibiae and tarsi they are reddish-brown.
