= Anisochelus =

Scientific classification
- Kingdom: Animalia
- Phylum: Arthropoda
- Class: Insecta
- Order: Coleoptera
- Suborder: Polyphaga
- Infraorder: Scarabaeiformia
- Family: Scarabaeidae
- Subfamily: Melolonthinae
- Tribe: Hopliini
- Genus: Anisochelus; Burmeister, 1844

Genus of leaf beetles

Anisochelus is a genus of beetles belonging to the family Scarabaeidae.

== Species ==
- Anisochelus hilaris Burmeister, 1844
- Anisochelus inornatus Burmeister, 1844
- Anisochelus neglectus Burmeister, 1844
