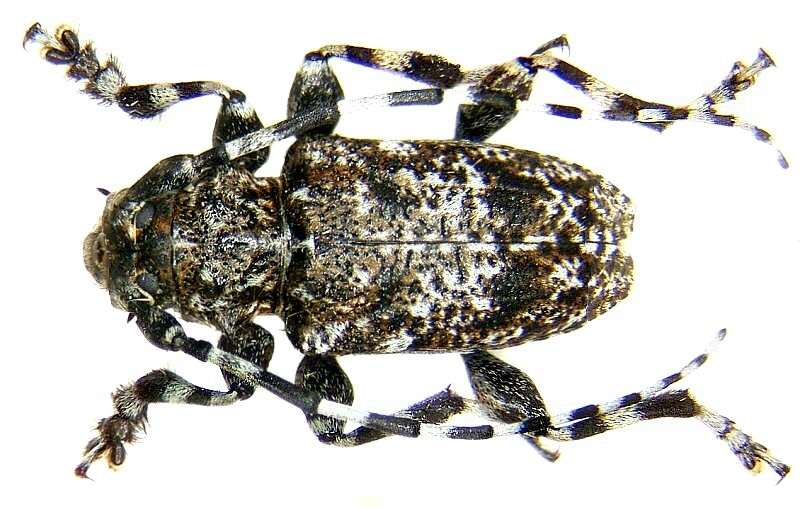
- Aegomorphus clavipes

Scientific classification
- Domain: Eukaryota
- Kingdom: Animalia
- Phylum: Arthropoda
- Class: Insecta
- Order: Coleoptera
- Suborder: Polyphaga
- Infraorder: Cucujiformia
- Family: Cerambycidae
- Subfamily: Lamiinae
- Tribe: Acanthoderini; Thomson, 1860

= Acanthoderini =

Tribe of beetles

Acanthoderini is a tribe of longhorn beetles of the subfamily Lamiinae. It was described by Thomson in 1860.

== Taxonomy ==
- Acakyra
- Acanthoderes
- Aegomorphus Haldeman, 1847
- Aegoschema
- Alphus
- Amblysaphes
- Anasillus
- Anoreina
- Ateralphus
- Azygocera
- Berningerus
- Callapoecoides
- Catuana
- Cosmotomidius
- Cotycicuiara
- Cotyzineus
- Criopsis
- Discopus
- Dryoctenes
- Dufauxia
- Eupromerella
- Exalphus
- Formozotroctes
- Grandateralphus
- Hedypathes
- Irundisaua
- Itajutinga
- Macronemus
- Melzerus
- Meridiotroctes
- Miguelmonneus
- Miriochrus
- Mundeu
- Myoxinus
- Myoxomorpha
- Necalphus
- Nesozineus
- Noxnympha
- Octotapnia
- Oplosia Mulsant, 1863
- Ozotroctes
- Paracanista
- Paradiscopus
- Parapolyacanthia
- Penaherreraus
- Peritapnia Horn, 1894
- Plagiosarus
- Plistonax
- Psapharoctes
- Pseudaethomerus
- Pseudotapnia
- Pteridotelus
- Punctozotroctes
- Pycnomorphidiellus
- Pyrianoreina
- Scleronotus
- Scythropopsis
- Sorelia
- Spinozotroctes
- Steirastoma Lepeletier and Audinet-Serville in Lacordaire, 1830
- Sychnomerus
- Symperasmus
- Taurorcus
- Tetrasarus
- Trichoanoreina
- Urangaua
- Wappesicus
- Zikanita
