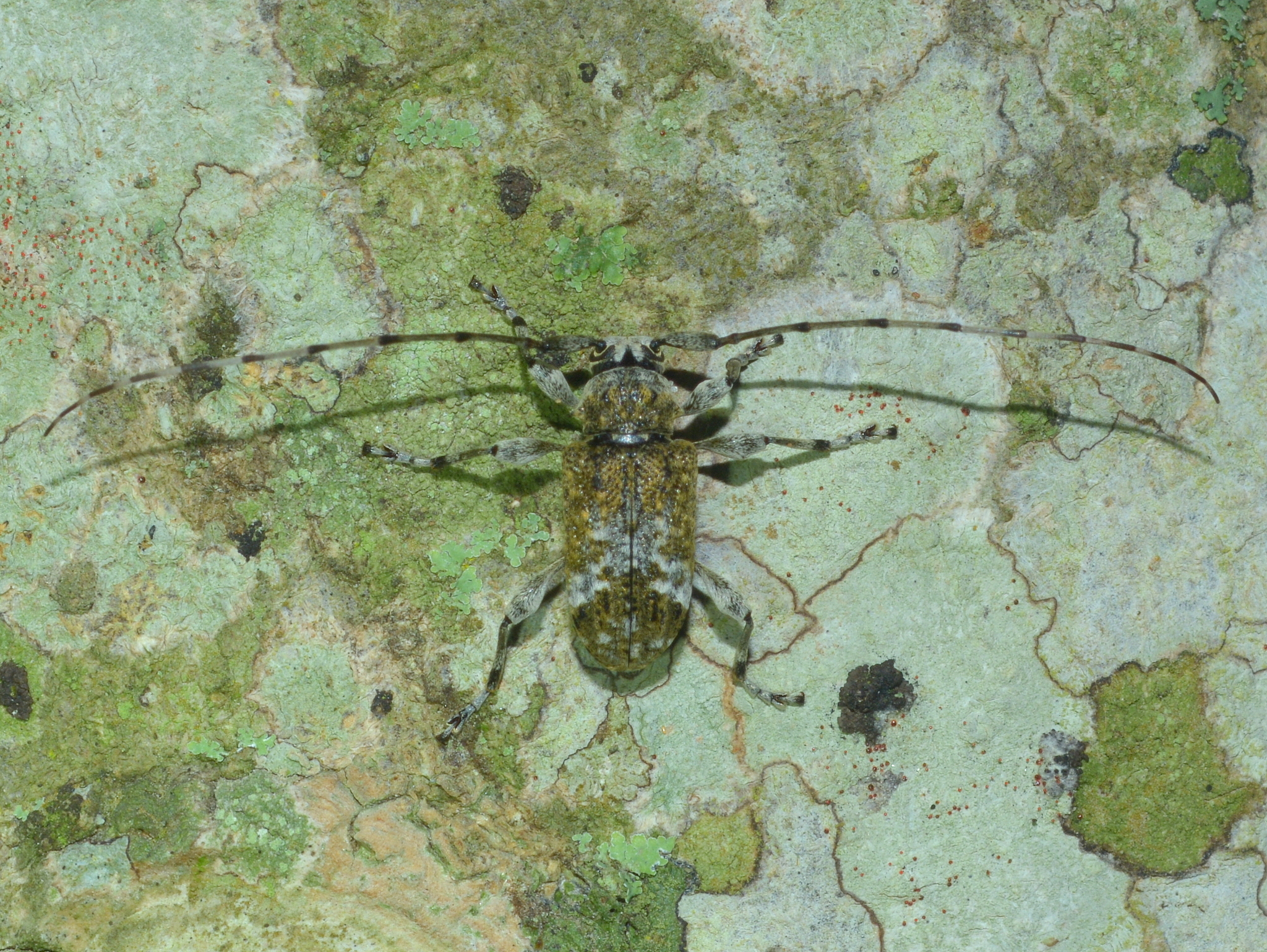

Scientific classification
- Kingdom: Animalia
- Phylum: Arthropoda
- Clade: Pancrustacea
- Class: Insecta
- Order: Coleoptera
- Suborder: Polyphaga
- Infraorder: Cucujiformia
- Family: Cerambycidae
- Genus: Exalphus
- Species: E. confusus

Binomial name
- Exalphus confusus Restello, 2001

= Exalphus confusus =

Species of beetle

Exalphus confusus is a species of beetle in the family Cerambycidae. Along with Exalphus spilonotus and four other beetles of the genus, the beetle was discovered in Brazil as a means to further describe the beetles of the genus in a study headed by the Universidad Federal de Paraná in 2001.
