= Nesozineus giesberti =

Scientific classification
- Kingdom: Animalia
- Phylum: Arthropoda
- Clade: Pancrustacea
- Class: Insecta
- Order: Coleoptera
- Suborder: Polyphaga
- Infraorder: Cucujiformia
- Family: Cerambycidae
- Genus: Nesozineus
- Species: N. giesberti

Binomial name
- Nesozineus giesberti Galileo & Martins, 2007

Species of beetle

Nesozineus giesberti is a species of beetle in the family Cerambycidae. It was described by Galileo and Martins in 2007. Named after the late Edmund F. Giesbert.

Its colored pattern can be compared to the one of a N. zonatus (Galileo & Martins, 1996), however, N. zonatus displays one sole white pubescence stripe, and doesn't have contrasting spots on the previous half of the elytras. While N. giesberti has two white pubescent stripes, in addition to numerous contrasting spots.
