= Exalphus aurivillii =

Scientific classification
- Domain: Eukaryota
- Kingdom: Animalia
- Phylum: Arthropoda
- Class: Insecta
- Order: Coleoptera
- Suborder: Polyphaga
- Infraorder: Cucujiformia
- Family: Cerambycidae
- Genus: Exalphus
- Species: E. aurivillii

Binomial name
- Exalphus aurivillii (Lane, 1970)

Species of beetle

Exalphus aurivillii is a species of beetle in the family Cerambycidae. It was described by Lane in 1970.
