= Ozotroctes punctatissimus =

Scientific classification
- Kingdom: Animalia
- Phylum: Arthropoda
- Class: Insecta
- Order: Coleoptera
- Suborder: Polyphaga
- Infraorder: Cucujiformia
- Family: Cerambycidae
- Genus: Ozotroctes
- Species: O. punctatissimus

Binomial name
- Ozotroctes punctatissimus Bates, 1861

Species of beetle

Ozotroctes punctatissimus is a species of beetle in the family Cerambycidae. It was described by Bates in 1861.
