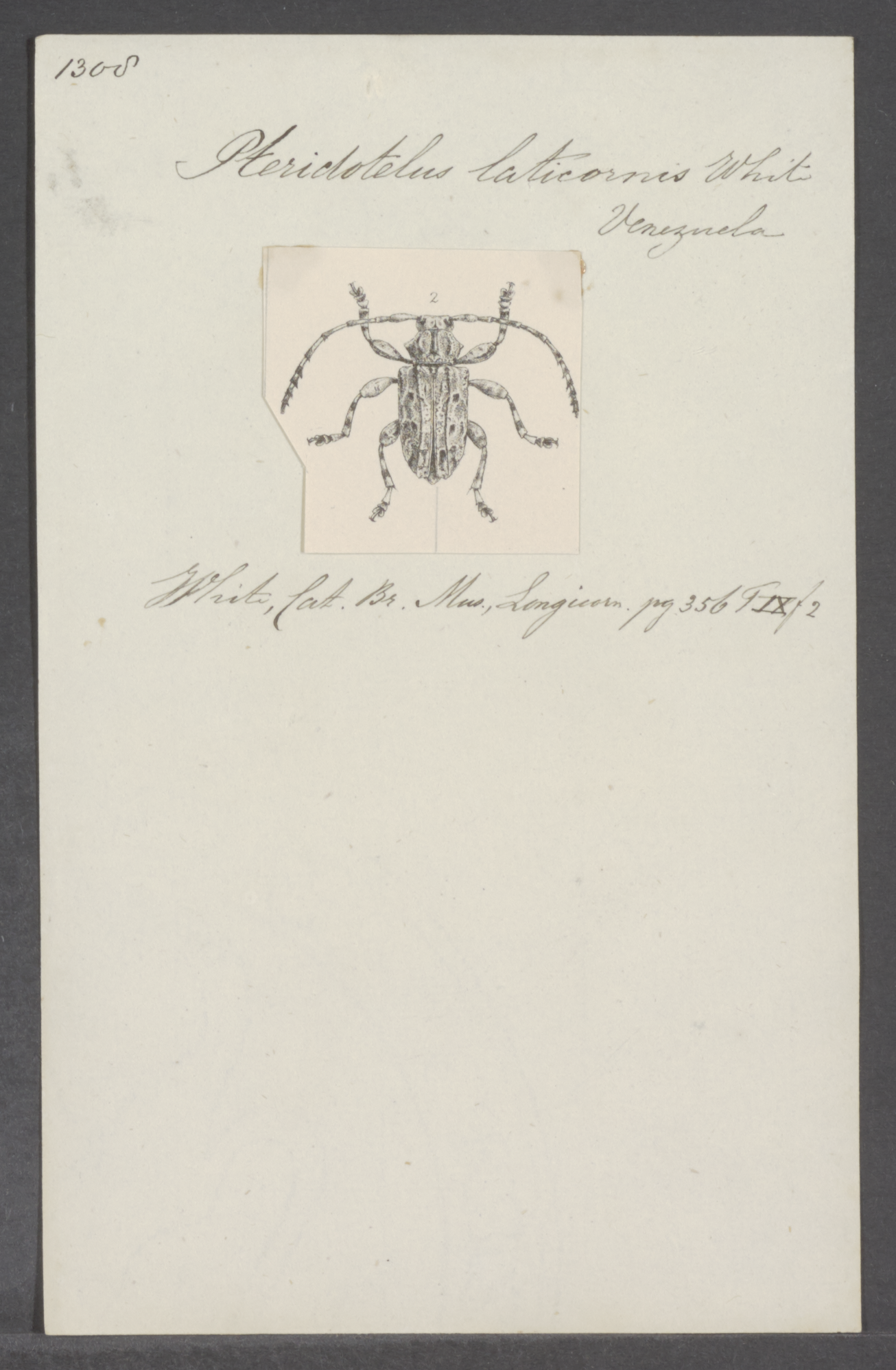
- Pteridotelus Print. Height:16,9 cm. Width:11,06 cm

Scientific classification
- Kingdom: Animalia
- Phylum: Arthropoda
- Class: Insecta
- Order: Coleoptera
- Suborder: Polyphaga
- Infraorder: Cucujiformia
- Family: Cerambycidae
- Tribe: Acanthoderini
- Genus: Pteridotelus

= Pteridotelus =

Genus of beetles

Pteridotelus is a genus of beetles in the family Cerambycidae, containing the following species:

- Pteridotelus hematopus (Lameere, 1884)
- Pteridotelus laticornis White, 1855
- Pteridotelus pupillatus Lacordaire, 1872
