= Necalphus decoratus =

Scientific classification
- Kingdom: Animalia
- Phylum: Arthropoda
- Class: Insecta
- Order: Coleoptera
- Suborder: Polyphaga
- Infraorder: Cucujiformia
- Family: Cerambycidae
- Genus: Necalphus
- Species: N. decoratus

Binomial name
- Necalphus decoratus (Monné & Magno, 1992)

Species of beetle

Necalphus decoratus is a species of beetle in the family Cerambycidae. It was described by Monné and Magno in 1992.
