= Sychnomerus =

Scientific classification
- Kingdom: Animalia
- Phylum: Arthropoda
- Class: Insecta
- Order: Coleoptera
- Suborder: Polyphaga
- Infraorder: Cucujiformia
- Family: Cerambycidae
- Tribe: Acanthoderini
- Genus: Sychnomerus

Genus of beetles

Sychnomerus is a genus of beetles in the family Cerambycidae, containing the following species:

- Sychnomerus barbiger Bates, 1885
- Sychnomerus hirticornis Bates, 1885
