= Nesozineus alphoides =

Scientific classification
- Kingdom: Animalia
- Phylum: Arthropoda
- Class: Insecta
- Order: Coleoptera
- Suborder: Polyphaga
- Infraorder: Cucujiformia
- Family: Cerambycidae
- Genus: Nesozineus
- Species: N. alphoides

Binomial name
- Nesozineus alphoides (Lane, 1977)

Species of beetle

Nesozineus alphoides is a species of beetle in the family Cerambycidae. It was described by Lane in 1977.
