= Meridiotroctes =

Scientific classification
- Kingdom: Animalia
- Phylum: Arthropoda
- Class: Insecta
- Order: Coleoptera
- Suborder: Polyphaga
- Infraorder: Cucujiformia
- Family: Cerambycidae
- Tribe: Acanthoderini
- Genus: Meridiotroctes

Genus of beetles

Meridiotroctes is a genus of beetles in the family Cerambycidae, containing the following species:

- Meridiotroctes bicristata Machado & Monne, 2009
- Meridiotroctes meridionale Martins & Galileo, 2007
- Meridiotroctes truncata Galileo & Martins, 2011
