= Plagiosarus literatus =

Scientific classification
- Kingdom: Animalia
- Phylum: Arthropoda
- Class: Insecta
- Order: Coleoptera
- Suborder: Polyphaga
- Infraorder: Cucujiformia
- Family: Cerambycidae
- Genus: Plagiosarus
- Species: P. literatus

Binomial name
- Plagiosarus literatus Bates, 1885

Species of beetle

Plagiosarus literatus is a species of beetle in the family Cerambycidae. It was described by Bates in 1885.
