= Myoxomorpha seabrai =

Scientific classification
- Kingdom: Animalia
- Phylum: Arthropoda
- Class: Insecta
- Order: Coleoptera
- Suborder: Polyphaga
- Infraorder: Cucujiformia
- Family: Cerambycidae
- Genus: Myoxomorpha
- Species: M. seabrai

Binomial name
- Myoxomorpha seabrai Marinoni & Dalossi, 1971

Species of beetle

Myoxomorpha seabrai is a species of beetle in the family Cerambycidae. It was described by Marinoni and Dalossi in 1971.
