= Sorelia =

Scientific classification
- Kingdom: Animalia
- Phylum: Arthropoda
- Class: Insecta
- Order: Coleoptera
- Suborder: Polyphaga
- Infraorder: Cucujiformia
- Family: Cerambycidae
- Tribe: Acanthoderini
- Genus: Sorelia; Lane, 1965
- Species: S. ferruginea

Binomial name
- Sorelia ferruginea (E. Fuchs, 1964)

Genus of beetles

Sorelia is a monotypic beetle genus in the family Cerambycidae described by Lane in 1965. Its only species, Sorelia ferruginea, was described by Ernst Fuchs in 1964.
