= Peritapnia minima =

Scientific classification
- Kingdom: Animalia
- Phylum: Arthropoda
- Class: Insecta
- Order: Coleoptera
- Suborder: Polyphaga
- Infraorder: Cucujiformia
- Family: Cerambycidae
- Genus: Peritapnia
- Species: P. minima

Binomial name
- Peritapnia minima Chemsak & Linsley, 1978

Species of beetle

Peritapnia minima is a species of beetle in the family Cerambycidae. It was described by Chemsak and Linsley in 1978.
