= Nesozineus amazonicus =

Scientific classification
- Kingdom: Animalia
- Phylum: Arthropoda
- Class: Insecta
- Order: Coleoptera
- Suborder: Polyphaga
- Infraorder: Cucujiformia
- Family: Cerambycidae
- Genus: Nesozineus
- Species: N. amazonicus

Binomial name
- Nesozineus amazonicus Martins & Galileo, 2010

Species of beetle

Nesozineus amazonicus is a species of beetle in the family Cerambycidae. It was described by Martins and Galileo in 2010.
