= Cotycicuiara bahiensis =

Scientific classification
- Kingdom: Animalia
- Phylum: Arthropoda
- Class: Insecta
- Order: Coleoptera
- Suborder: Polyphaga
- Infraorder: Cucujiformia
- Family: Cerambycidae
- Genus: Cotycicuiara
- Species: C. bahiensis

Binomial name
- Cotycicuiara bahiensis Galileo & Martins, 2008

Species of beetle

Cotycicuiara bahiensis is a species of beetle in the family Cerambycidae. It was described by Galileo and Martins in 2008. It is known from Brazil.
