= Penaherreraus pubicornis =

Scientific classification
- Kingdom: Animalia
- Phylum: Arthropoda
- Class: Insecta
- Order: Coleoptera
- Suborder: Polyphaga
- Infraorder: Cucujiformia
- Family: Cerambycidae
- Genus: Penaherreraus
- Species: P. pubicornis

Binomial name
- Penaherreraus pubicornis (Audinet-Serville, 1835)

Species of beetle

Penaherreraus pubicornis is a species of beetle in the family Cerambycidae. It was described by Audinet-Serville in 1835.
