= Nesozineus juninensis =

Scientific classification
- Kingdom: Animalia
- Phylum: Arthropoda
- Class: Insecta
- Order: Coleoptera
- Suborder: Polyphaga
- Infraorder: Cucujiformia
- Family: Cerambycidae
- Genus: Nesozineus
- Species: N. juninensis

Binomial name
- Nesozineus juninensis (Lane, 1970)

Species of beetle

Nesozineus juninensis is a species of beetle in the family Cerambycidae. It was described by Lane in 1970.
