= Penaherreraus sarryi =

Scientific classification
- Kingdom: Animalia
- Phylum: Arthropoda
- Class: Insecta
- Order: Coleoptera
- Suborder: Polyphaga
- Infraorder: Cucujiformia
- Family: Cerambycidae
- Genus: Penaherreraus
- Species: P. sarryi

Binomial name
- Penaherreraus sarryi (Tavakilian & Peñaherrera-Leiva, 2003)

Species of beetle

Penaherreraus sarryi is a species of beetle in the family Cerambycidae. It was described by Tavakilian and Peñaherrera-Leiva in 2003.
