= Anoreina nana =

Scientific classification
- Domain: Eukaryota
- Kingdom: Animalia
- Phylum: Arthropoda
- Class: Insecta
- Order: Coleoptera
- Suborder: Polyphaga
- Infraorder: Cucujiformia
- Family: Cerambycidae
- Genus: Anoreina
- Species: A. nana

Binomial name
- Anoreina nana (Bates, 1861)

Species of beetle

Anoreina nana is a species of beetle in the family Cerambycidae. It was described by Henry Walter Bates in 1861.
