= Symperasmus =

Scientific classification
- Domain: Eukaryota
- Kingdom: Animalia
- Phylum: Arthropoda
- Class: Insecta
- Order: Coleoptera
- Suborder: Polyphaga
- Infraorder: Cucujiformia
- Family: Cerambycidae
- Tribe: Acanthoderini
- Genus: Symperasmus; Thomson, 1864

Genus of beetles

Symperasmus is a genus of beetles in the family Cerambycidae, containing the following species:

- Symperasmus affinis (Thomson, 1865)
- Symperasmus alboniger (Bates, 1861)
- Symperasmus thoracicus (White, 1855)
