= Scythropopsis pupillata =

Scientific classification
- Kingdom: Animalia
- Phylum: Arthropoda
- Class: Insecta
- Order: Coleoptera
- Suborder: Polyphaga
- Infraorder: Cucujiformia
- Family: Cerambycidae
- Genus: Scythropopsis
- Species: S. pupillata

Binomial name
- Scythropopsis pupillata (Bates, 1880)

Synonyms
- Acanthoderes pupillatus Bates, 1880; Psapharochrus pupillatus Bates, 1880

Species of beetle

Scythropopsis pupillata is a species of beetle in the family Cerambycidae. It was described by Henry Walter Bates in 1880.
