= Ozotroctes vassali =

Scientific classification
- Kingdom: Animalia
- Phylum: Arthropoda
- Class: Insecta
- Order: Coleoptera
- Suborder: Polyphaga
- Infraorder: Cucujiformia
- Family: Cerambycidae
- Genus: Ozotroctes
- Species: O. vassali

Binomial name
- Ozotroctes vassali Tavakilian & Néouze, 2007

Species of beetle

Ozotroctes vassali is a species of beetle in the family Cerambycidae. It was described by Tavakilian and Néouze in 2007.
