= Irundisaua =

Scientific classification
- Domain: Eukaryota
- Kingdom: Animalia
- Phylum: Arthropoda
- Class: Insecta
- Order: Coleoptera
- Suborder: Polyphaga
- Infraorder: Cucujiformia
- Family: Cerambycidae
- Tribe: Acanthoderini
- Genus: Irundisaua

Genus of beetles

Irundisaua is a genus of beetles in the family Cerambycidae, containing the following species:

- Irundisaua balteata (Lane, 1972)
- Irundisaua forsteri (Tippmann, 1960)
- Irundisaua heloisae (Julio, 2003)
- Irundisaua lewisi Audureau, 2009
- Irundisaua moacyri (Julio, 2003)
- Irundisaua ocularis Martins & Galileo, 2005
- Irundisaua punctata Martins & Galileo, 2007
- Irundisaua ucayalensis (Tippmann, 1960)
