= Nesozineus galapagoensis =

Scientific classification
- Kingdom: Animalia
- Phylum: Arthropoda
- Class: Insecta
- Order: Coleoptera
- Suborder: Polyphaga
- Infraorder: Cucujiformia
- Family: Cerambycidae
- Genus: Nesozineus
- Species: N. galapagoensis

Binomial name
- Nesozineus galapagoensis (Van Dyke, 1953)

Species of beetle

Nesozineus galapagoensis is a species of beetle in the family Cerambycidae. It was described by Van Dyke in 1953.
