= Plagiosarus =

Scientific classification
- Kingdom: Animalia
- Phylum: Arthropoda
- Class: Insecta
- Order: Coleoptera
- Suborder: Polyphaga
- Infraorder: Cucujiformia
- Family: Cerambycidae
- Tribe: Acanthoderini
- Genus: Plagiosarus

Genus of beetles

Plagiosarus is a genus of beetles in the family Cerambycidae, containing the following species:

- Plagiosarus binoculus Bates, 1880
- Plagiosarus literatus Bates, 1885
- Plagiosarus melampus Bates, 1885
