= Penaherreraus =

Scientific classification
- Kingdom: Animalia
- Phylum: Arthropoda
- Class: Insecta
- Order: Coleoptera
- Suborder: Polyphaga
- Infraorder: Cucujiformia
- Family: Cerambycidae
- Subfamily: Lamiinae
- Tribe: Acanthoderini
- Genus: Penaherreraus; Roguet, 2004

Genus of beetles

Penaherreraus is a genus of beetles in the family Cerambycidae, containing the following species:

- Penaherreraus batesi Tavakilian & Peñaherrera-Leiva, 2003
- Penaherreraus bilineatus (Aurivillius, 1921)
- Penaherreraus centrolineatus (Bates, 1862)
- Penaherreraus guyanensis (Tavakilian & Peñaherrera-Leiva, 2003)
- Penaherreraus pradosiae (Tavakilian & Peñaherrera-Leiva, 2003)
- Penaherreraus pubicornis (Audinet-Serville, 1835)
- Penaherreraus sarryi (Tavakilian & Peñaherrera-Leiva, 2003)
