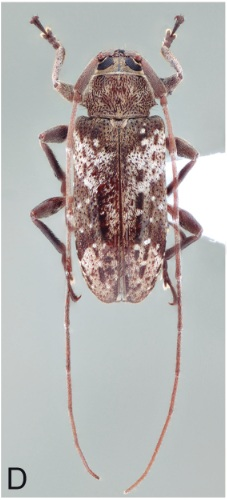

Scientific classification
- Kingdom: Animalia
- Phylum: Arthropoda
- Clade: Pancrustacea
- Class: Insecta
- Order: Coleoptera
- Suborder: Polyphaga
- Infraorder: Cucujiformia
- Family: Cerambycidae
- Genus: Nesozineus
- Species: N. simile

Binomial name
- Nesozineus simile Galileo & Martins, 2006

Synonyms
- Nesozineus similis

= Nesozineus simile =

Species of beetle

Nesozineus simile is a species of beetle in the family Cerambycidae. It was described by Galileo and Martins in 2006. It is found in Bolivia and Brazil (Maranhão, São Paulo).
