= Punctozotroctes wappesi =

Scientific classification
- Kingdom: Animalia
- Phylum: Arthropoda
- Class: Insecta
- Order: Coleoptera
- Suborder: Polyphaga
- Infraorder: Cucujiformia
- Family: Cerambycidae
- Genus: Punctozotroctes
- Species: P. wappesi

Binomial name
- Punctozotroctes wappesi Tavakilian & Neouze, 2007

Species of beetle

Punctozotroctes wappesi is a species of beetle in the family Cerambycidae. It was described by Tavakilian and Neouze in 2007.
