= Ozotroctes ogeri =

Scientific classification
- Kingdom: Animalia
- Phylum: Arthropoda
- Class: Insecta
- Order: Coleoptera
- Suborder: Polyphaga
- Infraorder: Cucujiformia
- Family: Cerambycidae
- Genus: Ozotroctes
- Species: O. ogeri

Binomial name
- Ozotroctes ogeri Tavakilian & Néouze, 2007

Species of beetle

Ozotroctes ogeri is a species of beetle in the family Cerambycidae. It was described by Tavakilian and Néouze in 2007.
