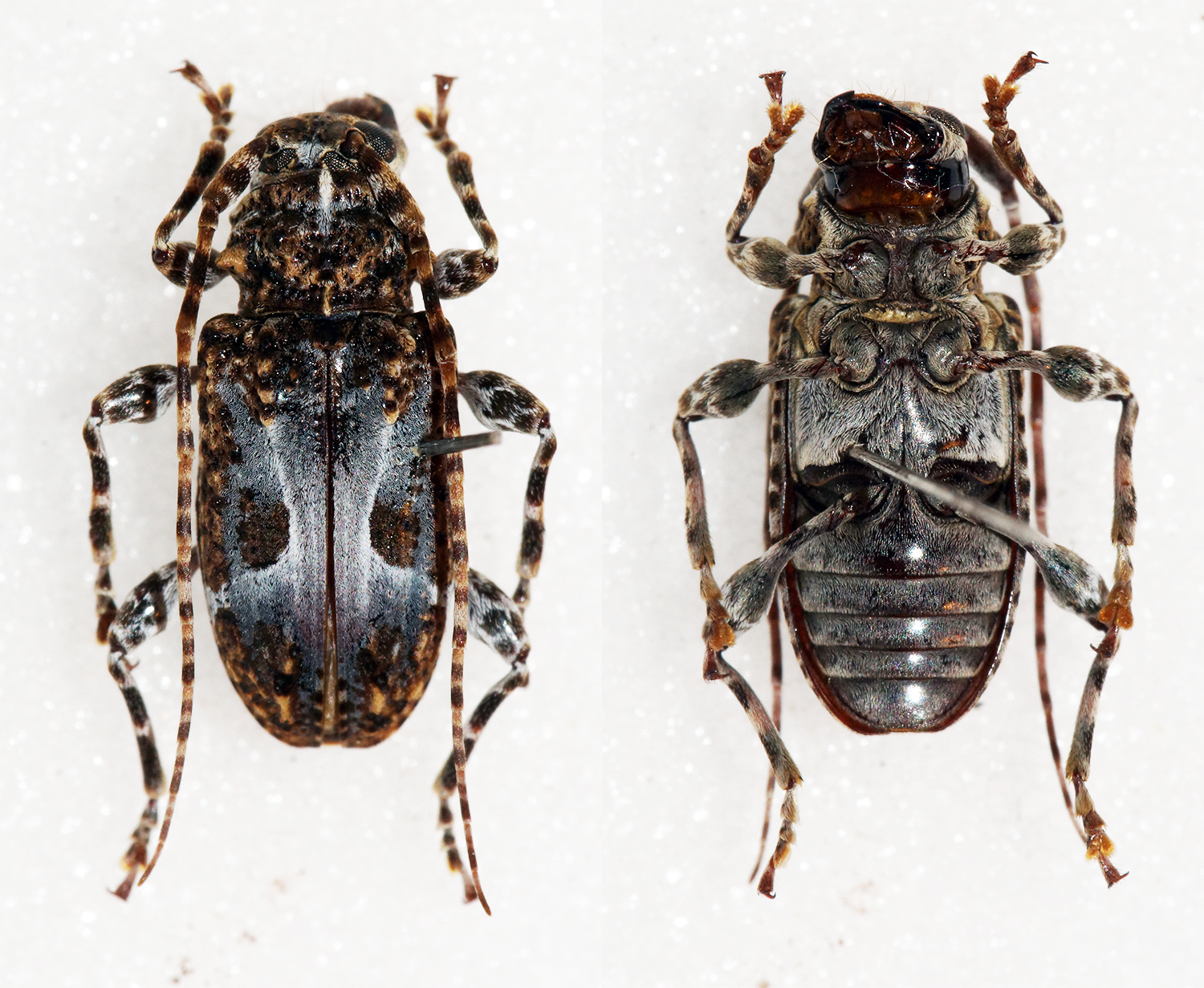

Scientific classification
- Domain: Eukaryota
- Kingdom: Animalia
- Phylum: Arthropoda
- Class: Insecta
- Order: Coleoptera
- Suborder: Polyphaga
- Infraorder: Cucujiformia
- Family: Cerambycidae
- Genus: Exalphus
- Species: E. biannulatus

Binomial name
- Exalphus biannulatus (Aurivillius, 1921)

= Exalphus biannulatus =

Species of beetle

Exalphus biannulatus is a species of beetle in the family Cerambycidae. It was described by Per Olof Christopher Aurivillius in 1921.
