= Azygocera =

Scientific classification
- Kingdom: Animalia
- Phylum: Arthropoda
- Clade: Pancrustacea
- Class: Insecta
- Order: Coleoptera
- Suborder: Polyphaga
- Infraorder: Cucujiformia
- Family: Cerambycidae
- Tribe: Acanthoderini
- Genus: Azygocera
- Species: A. picturata

Binomial name
- Azygocera picturata (Fairmaire & Germain, 1859)

Genus of beetles

Azygocera picturata is a species of beetle in the family Cerambycidae, the only species in the genus Azygocera.
