= Octotapnia exotica =

Scientific classification
- Domain: Eukaryota
- Kingdom: Animalia
- Phylum: Arthropoda
- Class: Insecta
- Order: Coleoptera
- Suborder: Polyphaga
- Infraorder: Cucujiformia
- Family: Cerambycidae
- Genus: Octotapnia
- Species: O. exotica

Binomial name
- Octotapnia exotica Galileo & Martins, 1992

Species of beetle

Octotapnia exotica is a species of beetle in the family Cerambycidae. It was described by Galileo and Martins in 1992.
