= Taurorcus mourei =

Scientific classification
- Kingdom: Animalia
- Phylum: Arthropoda
- Class: Insecta
- Order: Coleoptera
- Suborder: Polyphaga
- Infraorder: Cucujiformia
- Family: Cerambycidae
- Genus: Taurorcus
- Species: T. mourei

Binomial name
- Taurorcus mourei Marinoni, 1969

Species of beetle

Taurorcus mourei is a species of beetle in the family Cerambycidae. It was described by Marinoni in 1969.
