= Anasillus =

Scientific classification
- Domain: Eukaryota
- Kingdom: Animalia
- Phylum: Arthropoda
- Class: Insecta
- Order: Coleoptera
- Suborder: Polyphaga
- Infraorder: Cucujiformia
- Family: Cerambycidae
- Tribe: Acanthoderini
- Genus: Anasillus
- Species: A. crinitus

Binomial name
- Anasillus crinitus Marinoni & Martins, 1978

Genus of beetles

Anasillus crinitus is a species of beetle in the family Cerambycidae, the only species in the genus Anasillus.
