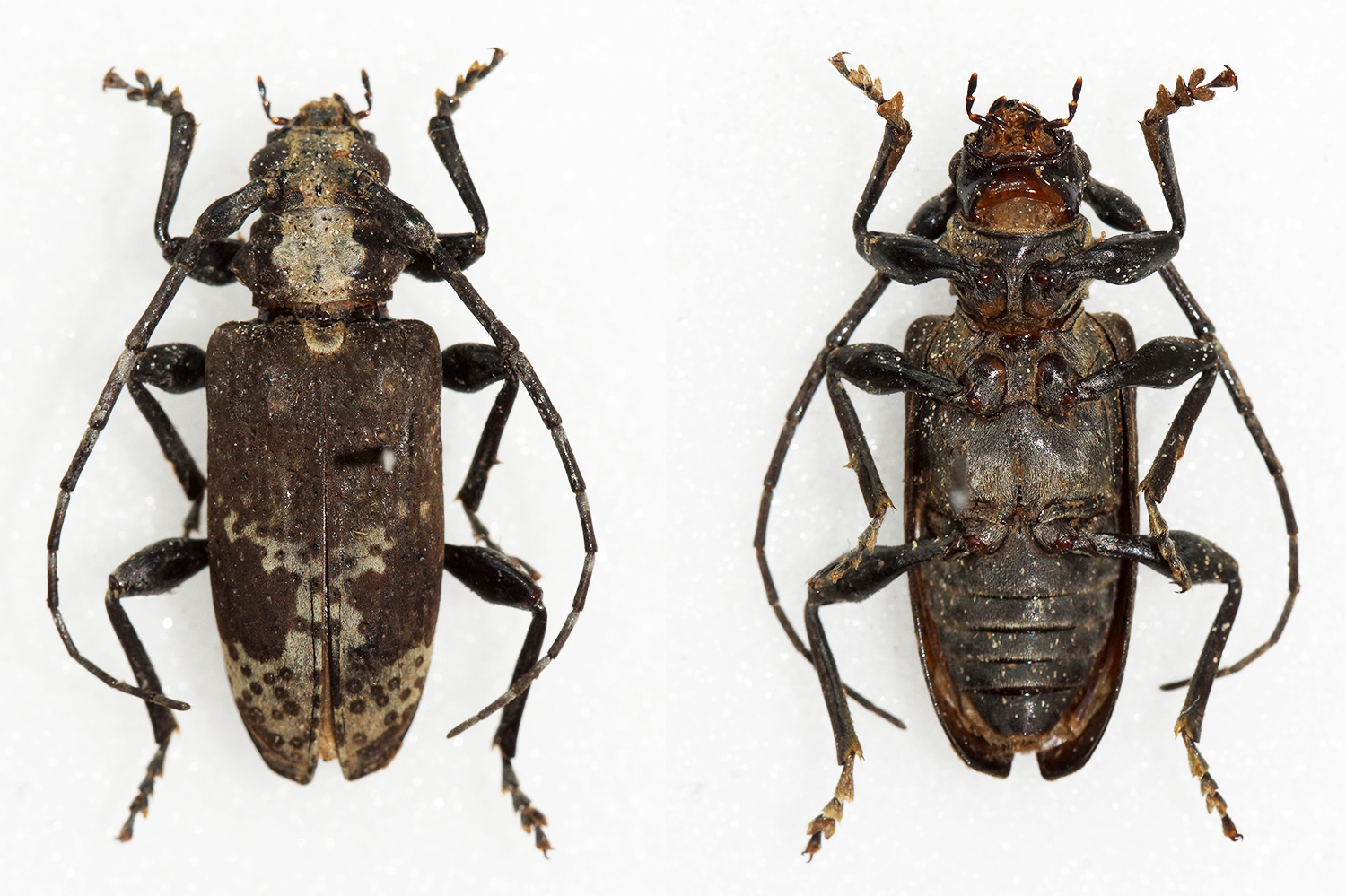
- Myoxomorpha funesta

Scientific classification
- Kingdom: Animalia
- Phylum: Arthropoda
- Class: Insecta
- Order: Coleoptera
- Suborder: Polyphaga
- Infraorder: Cucujiformia
- Family: Cerambycidae
- Subfamily: Lamiinae
- Tribe: Acanthoderini
- Genus: Myoxomorpha; White, 1855

= Myoxomorpha =

Genus of beetles

Myoxomorpha is a genus of beetles in the family Cerambycidae, containing the following species:

- Myoxomorpha alvarengorum Monné & Magno, 1990
- Myoxomorpha funesta (Erichson in Schomburg, 1848)
- Myoxomorpha seabrai Marinoni & Dalossi, 1971
- Myoxomorpha vidua Lacordaire, 1872
