= Punctozotroctes tuberculatus =

Scientific classification
- Kingdom: Animalia
- Phylum: Arthropoda
- Class: Insecta
- Order: Coleoptera
- Suborder: Polyphaga
- Infraorder: Cucujiformia
- Family: Cerambycidae
- Genus: Punctozotroctes
- Species: P. tuberculatus

Binomial name
- Punctozotroctes tuberculatus Galileo & Martins, 2011

Species of beetle

Punctozotroctes tuberculatus is a species of beetle in the family Cerambycidae. It was described by Galileo and Martins in 2011.
