= Punctozotroctes =

Scientific classification
- Kingdom: Animalia
- Phylum: Arthropoda
- Class: Insecta
- Order: Coleoptera
- Suborder: Polyphaga
- Infraorder: Cucujiformia
- Family: Cerambycidae
- Subfamily: Lamiinae
- Tribe: Acanthoderini
- Genus: Punctozotroctes; Tavakilian & Néouze, 2007

Genus of beetles

Punctozotroctes is a genus of beetles in the family Cerambycidae, containing the following species:

- Punctozotroctes bolivianus Martins & Galileo, 2007
- Punctozotroctes chemsaki Tavakilian & Neouze, 2007
- Punctozotroctes feuilleti Tavakilian & Neouze, 2007
- Punctozotroctes guianensis Tavakilian & Neouze, 2007
- Punctozotroctes hovorei Tavakilian & Neouze, 2007
- Punctozotroctes inhamum Martins, Galileo & Limeira-de-Olveira, 2009
- Punctozotroctes nordestinus Martins & Galileo, 2007
- Punctozotroctes tuberculatus Galileo & Martins, 2011
- Punctozotroctes wappesi Tavakilian & Neouze, 2007
