= Irundisaua ocularis =

Scientific classification
- Domain: Eukaryota
- Kingdom: Animalia
- Phylum: Arthropoda
- Class: Insecta
- Order: Coleoptera
- Suborder: Polyphaga
- Infraorder: Cucujiformia
- Family: Cerambycidae
- Genus: Irundisaua
- Species: I. ocularis

Binomial name
- Irundisaua ocularis Martins & Galileo, 2005

Species of beetle

Irundisaua ocularis is a species of beetle in the family Cerambycidae. It was described by Martins and Galileo in 2005.
