= Anoreina roosevelti =

Scientific classification
- Domain: Eukaryota
- Kingdom: Animalia
- Phylum: Arthropoda
- Class: Insecta
- Order: Coleoptera
- Suborder: Polyphaga
- Infraorder: Cucujiformia
- Family: Cerambycidae
- Genus: Anoreina
- Species: A. roosevelti

Binomial name
- Anoreina roosevelti Machado & Monne, 2011

Species of beetle

Anoreina roosevelti is a species of beetle in the family Cerambycidae. It was described by Vanessa S. Machado and Marcela L. Monné in 2011.
