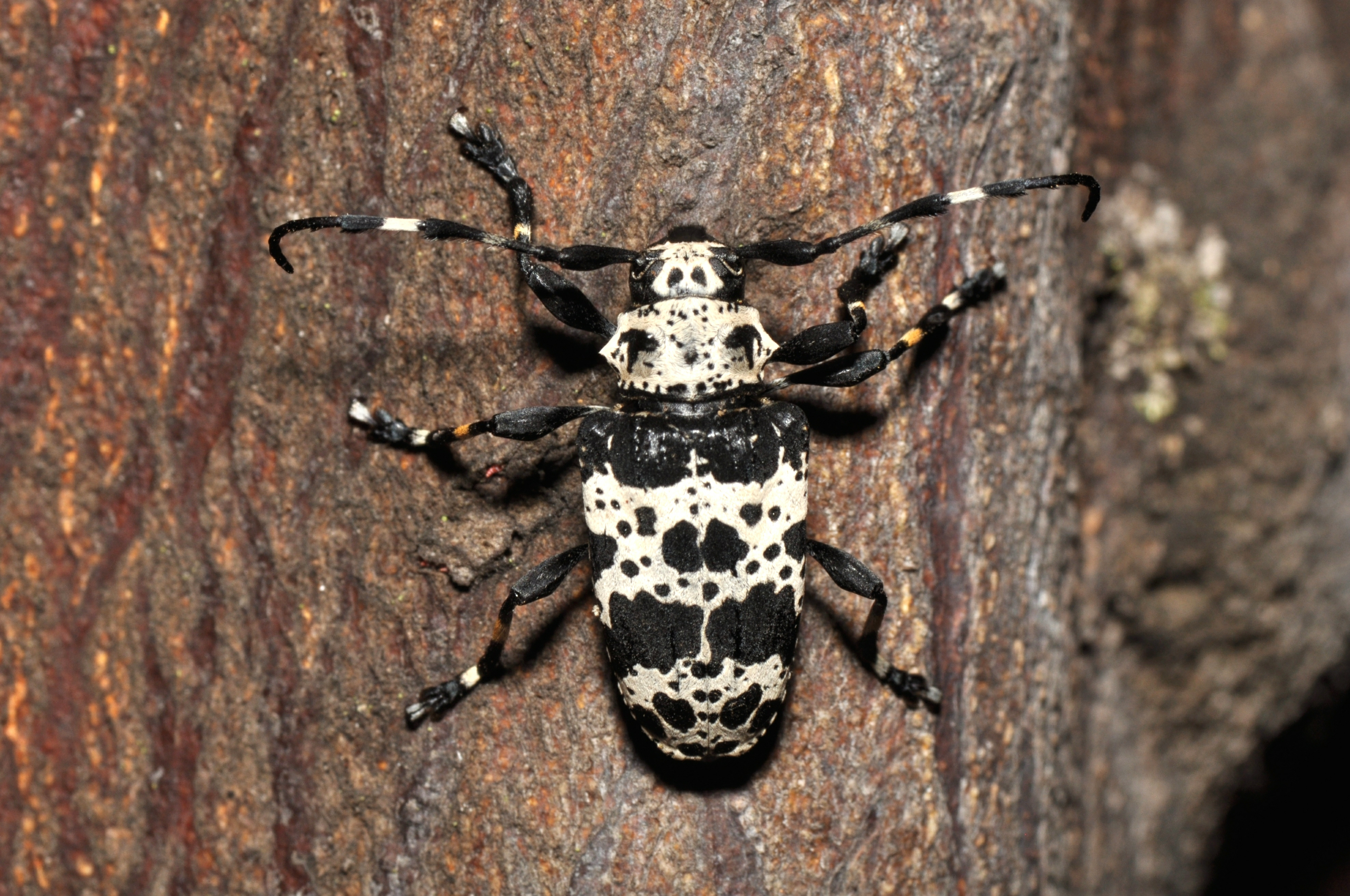

Scientific classification
- Kingdom: Animalia
- Phylum: Arthropoda
- Class: Insecta
- Order: Coleoptera
- Suborder: Polyphaga
- Infraorder: Cucujiformia
- Family: Cerambycidae
- Genus: Scythropopsis
- Species: S. lacrymans

Binomial name
- Scythropopsis lacrymans (Thomson, 1865)

Synonyms
- Pteridotelus Lacrymans Thomson, 1865; Acanthoderes lacrymans (Thomson, 1865); Acanthoderes lachrymosus Bates, 1880 (misspelling)

= Scythropopsis lacrymans =

Species of beetle

Scythropopsis lacrymans is a species of beetle in the family Cerambycidae.
