= Myoxomorpha vidua =

Scientific classification
- Kingdom: Animalia
- Phylum: Arthropoda
- Class: Insecta
- Order: Coleoptera
- Suborder: Polyphaga
- Infraorder: Cucujiformia
- Family: Cerambycidae
- Genus: Myoxomorpha
- Species: M. vidua

Binomial name
- Myoxomorpha vidua Lacordaire, 1872

Species of beetle

Myoxomorpha vidua is a species of beetle in the family Cerambycidae. It was described by Lacordaire in 1872.
