= Pyrianoreina hovorei =

Scientific classification
- Kingdom: Animalia
- Phylum: Arthropoda
- Class: Insecta
- Order: Coleoptera
- Suborder: Polyphaga
- Infraorder: Cucujiformia
- Family: Cerambycidae
- Genus: Pyrianoreina
- Species: P. hovorei

Binomial name
- Pyrianoreina hovorei Martins & Galileo, 2008

Species of beetle

Pyrianoreina hovorei is a species of beetle in the family Cerambycidae. It was described by Martins and Galileo in 2008.
