= Peritapnia fabra =

Scientific classification
- Kingdom: Animalia
- Phylum: Arthropoda
- Class: Insecta
- Order: Coleoptera
- Suborder: Polyphaga
- Infraorder: Cucujiformia
- Family: Cerambycidae
- Genus: Peritapnia
- Species: P. fabra

Binomial name
- Peritapnia fabra Horn, 1894

Species of beetle

Peritapnia fabra is a species of beetle in the family Cerambycidae. It was described by Horn in 1894.
