= Scythropopsis sallei =

Scientific classification
- Kingdom: Animalia
- Phylum: Arthropoda
- Class: Insecta
- Order: Coleoptera
- Suborder: Polyphaga
- Infraorder: Cucujiformia
- Family: Cerambycidae
- Genus: Scythropopsis
- Species: S. sallei

Binomial name
- Scythropopsis sallei (Thomson, 1865)

Synonyms
- Psapharochrus Sallei Thomson, 1865

Species of beetle

Scythropopsis sallei is a species of beetle in the family Cerambycidae. It was described by Thomson in 1865.
