= Nesozineus unicolor =

Scientific classification
- Kingdom: Animalia
- Phylum: Arthropoda
- Class: Insecta
- Order: Coleoptera
- Suborder: Polyphaga
- Infraorder: Cucujiformia
- Family: Cerambycidae
- Genus: Nesozineus
- Species: N. unicolor

Binomial name
- Nesozineus unicolor Martins, Galileo & de-Oliveira, 2009

Species of beetle

Nesozineus unicolor is a species of beetle in the family Cerambycidae. It was described by Martins, Galileo and de-Oliveira in 2009.
