= Ozotroctes =

Scientific classification
- Kingdom: Animalia
- Phylum: Arthropoda
- Class: Insecta
- Order: Coleoptera
- Suborder: Polyphaga
- Infraorder: Cucujiformia
- Family: Cerambycidae
- Tribe: Acanthoderini
- Genus: Ozotroctes; Bates, 1861

Genus of beetles

Ozotroctes is a genus of beetles in the family Cerambycidae, containing the following species:

- Ozotroctes ogeri Tavakilian & Néouze, 2007
- Ozotroctes punctatissimus Bates, 1861
- Ozotroctes vassali Tavakilian & Néouze, 2007
