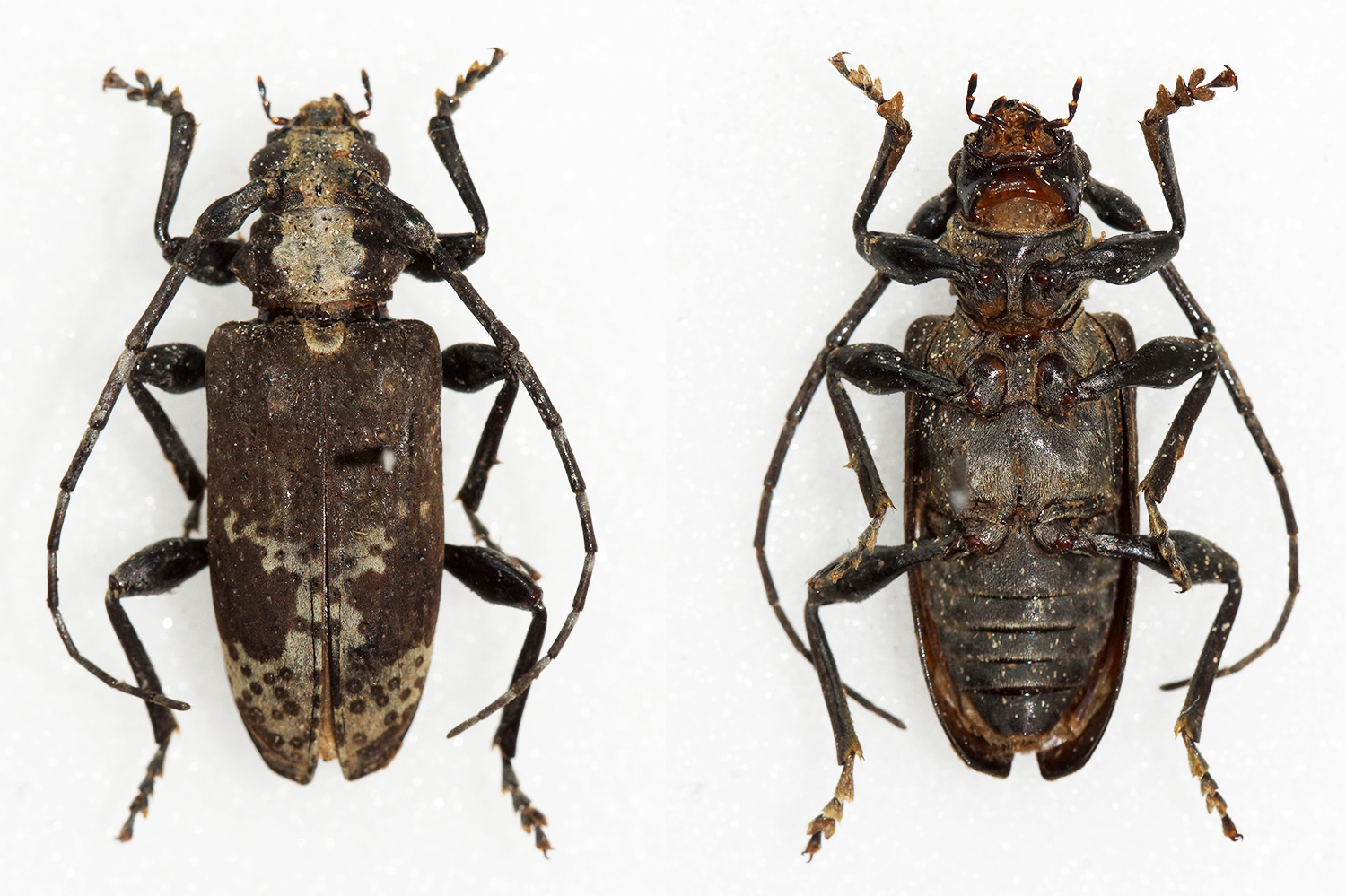

Scientific classification
- Kingdom: Animalia
- Phylum: Arthropoda
- Class: Insecta
- Order: Coleoptera
- Suborder: Polyphaga
- Infraorder: Cucujiformia
- Family: Cerambycidae
- Genus: Myoxomorpha
- Species: M. funesta

Binomial name
- Myoxomorpha funesta (Erichson in Schomburg, 1848)

= Myoxomorpha funesta =

Species of beetle

Myoxomorpha funesta is a species of beetle in the family Cerambycidae. It was described by Wilhelm Ferdinand Erichson in 1848. It is found in South America, spottings in Venezuela, French Guiana, Brazil, and Bolivia.
