= Necalphus =

Scientific classification
- Kingdom: Animalia
- Phylum: Arthropoda
- Class: Insecta
- Order: Coleoptera
- Suborder: Polyphaga
- Infraorder: Cucujiformia
- Family: Cerambycidae
- Tribe: Acanthoderini
- Genus: Necalphus

Genus of beetles

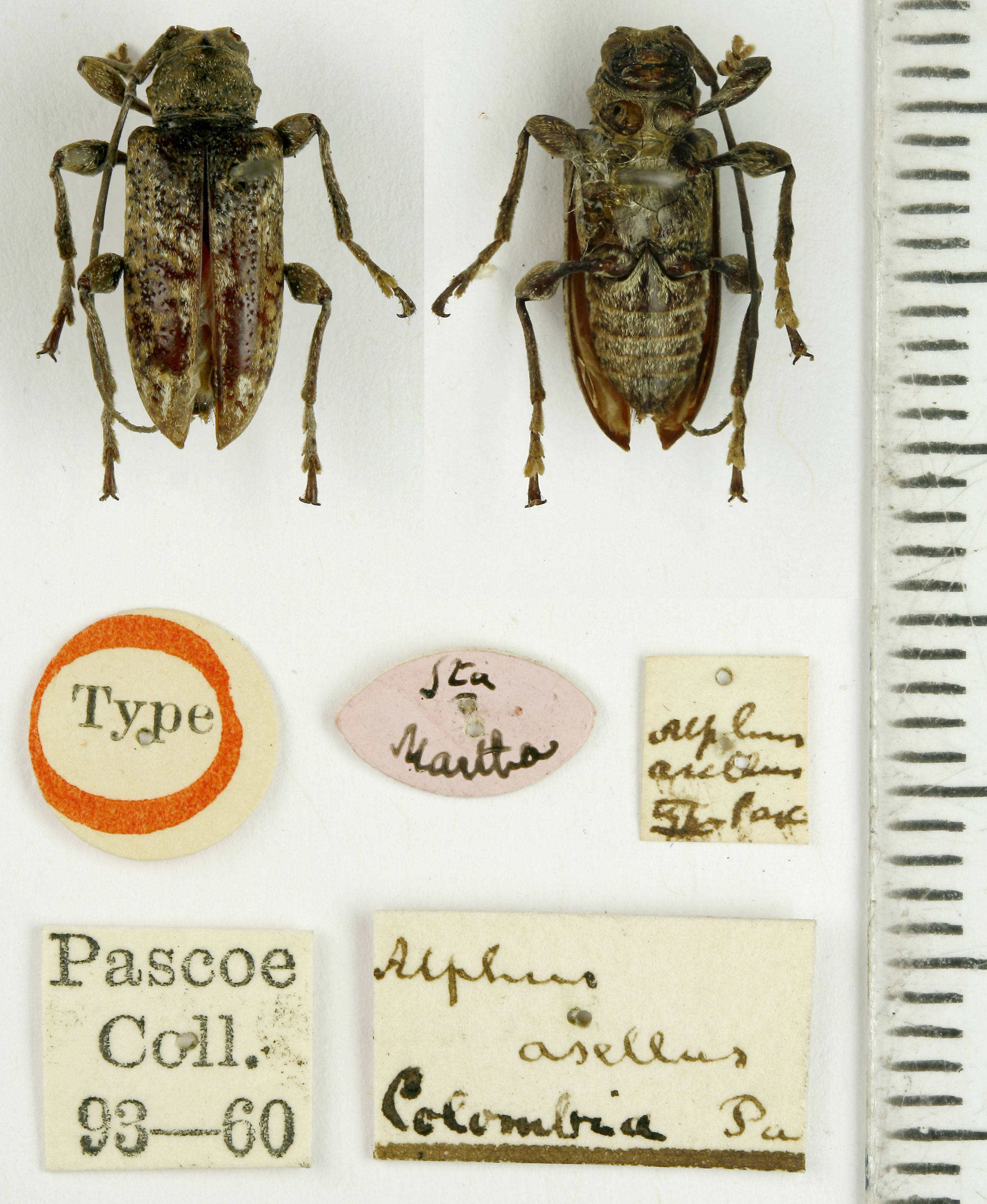
Necalphus asellus specimen

Necalphus is a genus of beetles in the family Cerambycidae, containing the following species:

- Necalphus asellus (Pascoe, 1866)
- Necalphus decoratus (Monné & Magno, 1992)
