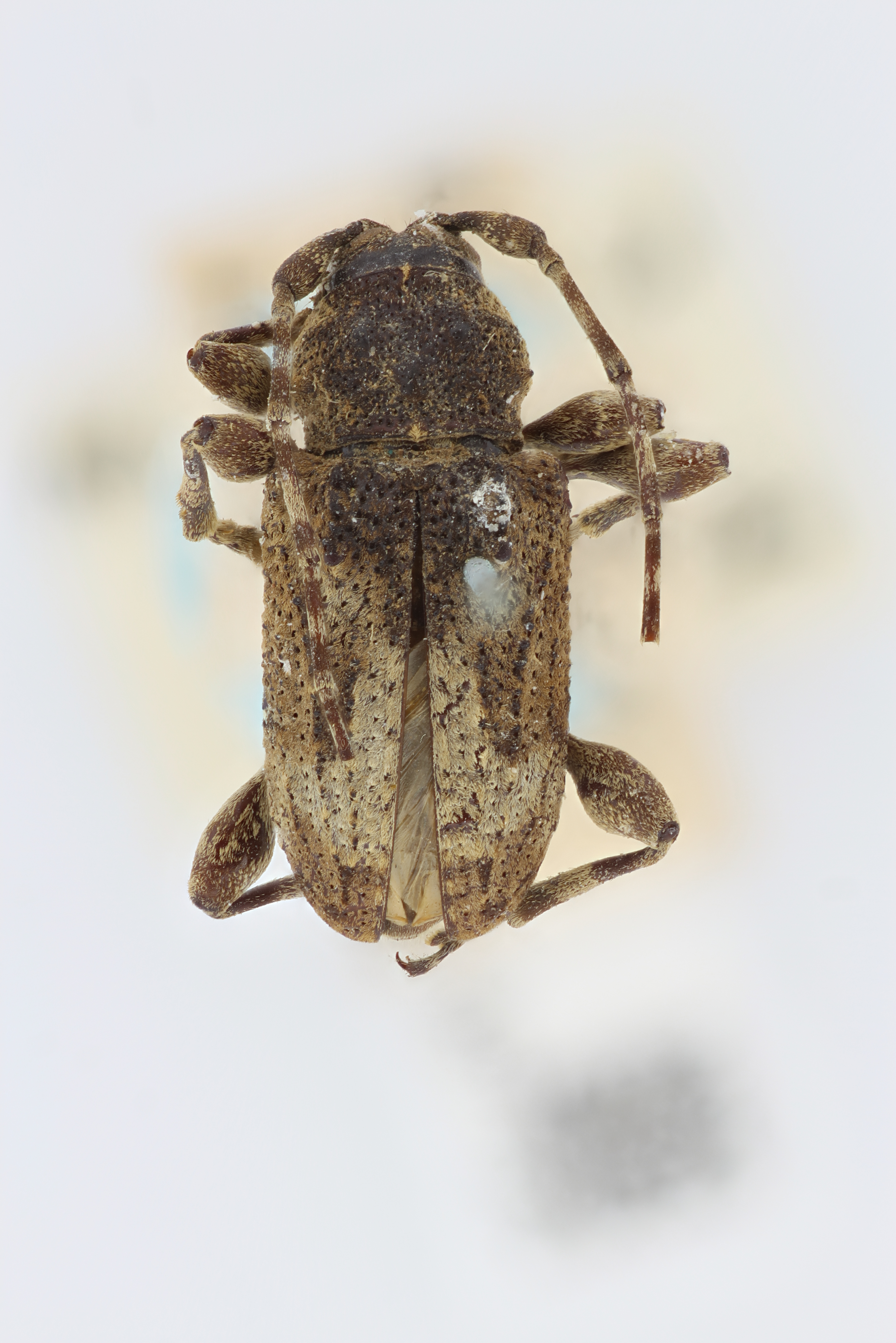

Scientific classification
- Kingdom: Animalia
- Phylum: Arthropoda
- Class: Insecta
- Order: Coleoptera
- Suborder: Polyphaga
- Infraorder: Cucujiformia
- Family: Cerambycidae
- Genus: Myoxinus
- Species: M. asper

Binomial name
- Myoxinus asper Bates, 1880

= Myoxinus asper =

Species of beetle

Myoxinus asper is a species of beetle in the family Cerambycidae. It was described by Bates in 1880.
