= Scythropopsis abstersa =

Scientific classification
- Kingdom: Animalia
- Phylum: Arthropoda
- Class: Insecta
- Order: Coleoptera
- Suborder: Polyphaga
- Infraorder: Cucujiformia
- Family: Cerambycidae
- Genus: Scythropopsis
- Species: S. abstersa

Binomial name
- Scythropopsis abstersa (Bates, 1880)

Synonyms
- Acanthoderes abstersus Bates, 1880; Psapharochrus abstersus (Bates, 1880)

Species of beetle

Scythropopsis abstersa is a species of beetle in the family Cerambycidae. It was described by Henry Walter Bates in 1880.
