= Scythropopsis lugens =

Scientific classification
- Kingdom: Animalia
- Phylum: Arthropoda
- Class: Insecta
- Order: Coleoptera
- Suborder: Polyphaga
- Infraorder: Cucujiformia
- Family: Cerambycidae
- Genus: Scythropopsis
- Species: S. lugens

Binomial name
- Scythropopsis lugens (Thomson, 1865)

Synonyms
- Psapharochrus lugens Thomson, 1865

Species of beetle

Scythropopsis lugens is a species of beetle in the family Cerambycidae. It was described by Thomson in 1865.
