= Symperasmus thoracicus =

Scientific classification
- Domain: Eukaryota
- Kingdom: Animalia
- Phylum: Arthropoda
- Class: Insecta
- Order: Coleoptera
- Suborder: Polyphaga
- Infraorder: Cucujiformia
- Family: Cerambycidae
- Genus: Symperasmus
- Species: S. thoracicus

Binomial name
- Symperasmus thoracicus (White, 1855)

Synonyms
- Acanthoderes thoracicus White, 1855; Symperasmus Thomicus Thomson, 1864 (misspelling); Acanthoderes uyapensis Martins & Galileo, 2004

Species of beetle

Symperasmus thoracicus is a species of beetle in the family Cerambycidae. It was described by White in 1855.
