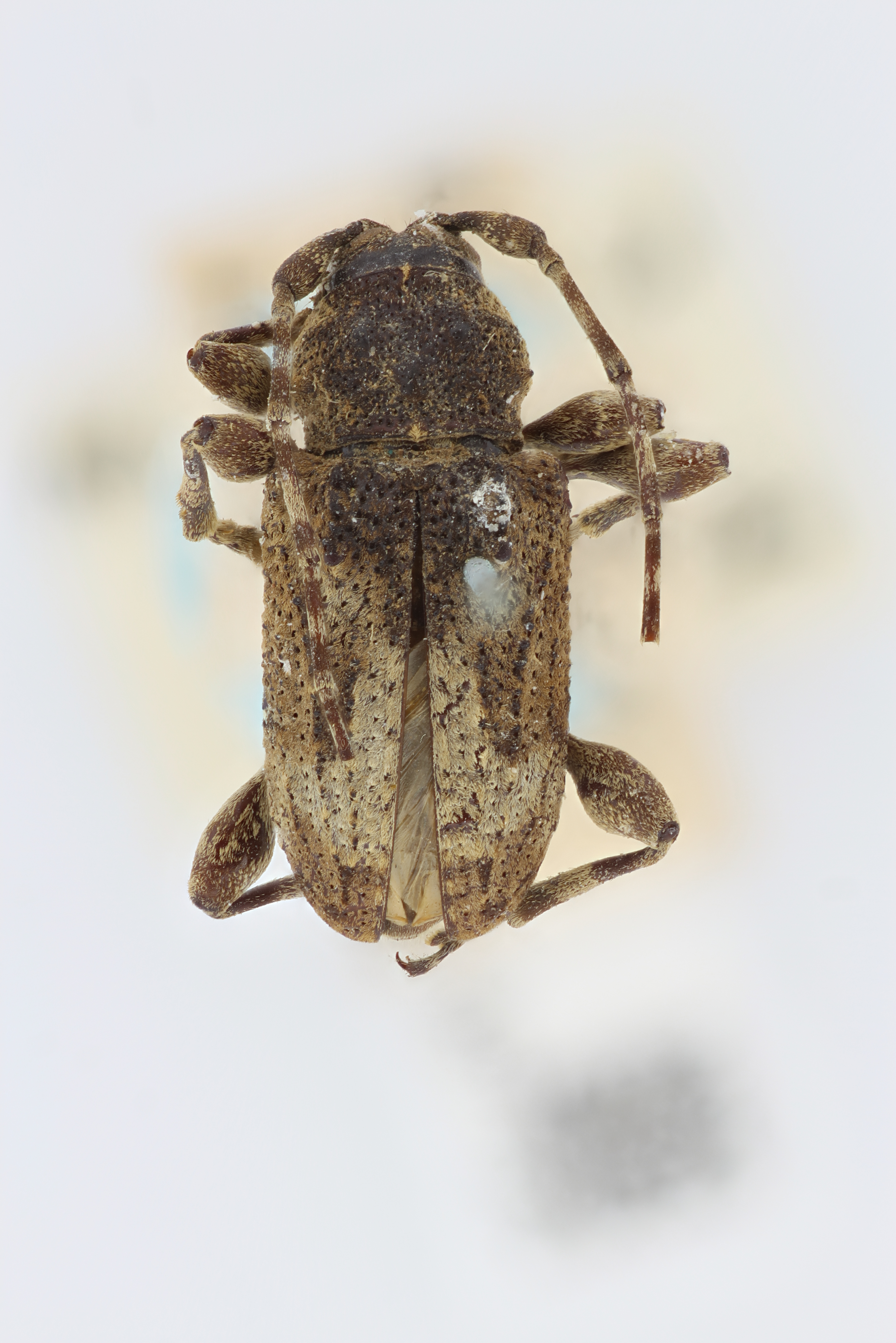
- Myoxinus asper Bates, 1880

Scientific classification
- Kingdom: Animalia
- Phylum: Arthropoda
- Class: Insecta
- Order: Coleoptera
- Suborder: Polyphaga
- Infraorder: Cucujiformia
- Family: Cerambycidae
- Tribe: Acanthoderini
- Genus: Myoxinus

= Myoxinus =

Genus of beetles

Myoxinus is a genus of beetles in the family Cerambycidae, containing the following species:

- Myoxinus asper Bates, 1880
- Myoxinus pictus (Erichson, 1847)
