= Pteridotelus hematopus =

Scientific classification
- Kingdom: Animalia
- Phylum: Arthropoda
- Class: Insecta
- Order: Coleoptera
- Suborder: Polyphaga
- Infraorder: Cucujiformia
- Family: Cerambycidae
- Genus: Pteridotelus
- Species: P. hematopus

Binomial name
- Pteridotelus hematopus (Lameere, 1884)

Species of beetle

Pteridotelus hematopus is a species of beetle in the family Cerambycidae. It was described by Lameere in 1884.
