= Myoxomorpha alvarengorum =

Scientific classification
- Kingdom: Animalia
- Phylum: Arthropoda
- Class: Insecta
- Order: Coleoptera
- Suborder: Polyphaga
- Infraorder: Cucujiformia
- Family: Cerambycidae
- Genus: Myoxomorpha
- Species: M. alvarengorum

Binomial name
- Myoxomorpha alvarengorum Monné & Magno, 1990

Species of beetle

Myoxomorpha alvarengorum is a species of beetle in the family Cerambycidae. It was described by Monné and Magno in 1990.
