= Scythropopsis nigritarsis =

Scientific classification
- Kingdom: Animalia
- Phylum: Arthropoda
- Class: Insecta
- Order: Coleoptera
- Suborder: Polyphaga
- Infraorder: Cucujiformia
- Family: Cerambycidae
- Genus: Scythropopsis
- Species: S. nigritarsis

Binomial name
- Scythropopsis nigritarsis (White, 1855)

Synonyms
- Acanthoderes nigritarsis White, 1855; Acanthoderes sylvanus Bates, 1880; Psapharochrus nigritarsis (White, 1855)

Species of beetle

Scythropopsis nigritarsis is a species of beetle in the family Cerambycidae. It was described by White in 1855.
