= Nesozineus propinquus =

Scientific classification
- Kingdom: Animalia
- Phylum: Arthropoda
- Class: Insecta
- Order: Coleoptera
- Suborder: Polyphaga
- Infraorder: Cucujiformia
- Family: Cerambycidae
- Genus: Nesozineus
- Species: N. propinquus

Binomial name
- Nesozineus propinquus M. Hoffmann, 1984

Species of beetle

Nesozineus propinquus is a species of beetle in the family Cerambycidae. It was described by M. Hoffmann in 1984.
