= Scythropopsis =

Scientific classification
- Kingdom: Animalia
- Phylum: Arthropoda
- Class: Insecta
- Order: Coleoptera
- Suborder: Polyphaga
- Infraorder: Cucujiformia
- Family: Cerambycidae
- Subfamily: Lamiinae
- Tribe: Acanthoderini
- Genus: Scythropopsis; Thomson, 1864

Genus of beetles

Scythropopsis is a genus of beetles in the family Cerambycidae, containing the following species, most of which were formerly classified under the genus name Psapharochrus:

- Scythropopsis abstersa (Bates, 1880)
- Scythropopsis albitarsis (Laporte, 1840)
- Scythropopsis barrerai (Chemsak & Hovore, 2002)
- Scythropopsis boucheri Tavakilian & Néouze, 2013
- Scythropopsis cornuta (Bates, 1880)
- Scythropopsis granitica Vlasák & Santos-Silva, 2020
- Scythropopsis intricata Santos-Silva, Botero & Wappes, 2020
- Scythropopsis lacrymans (Thomson, 1865)
- Scythropopsis lugens (Thomson, 1865)
- Scythropopsis melanostictica (White, 1855)
- Scythropopsis nigritarsis (White, 1855)
- Scythropopsis pupillata (Bates, 1880)
- Scythropopsis sallei Thomson, 1865
- Scythropopsis wappesi (Chemsak & Hovore, 2002)
