= Pteridotelus laticornis =

Scientific classification
- Kingdom: Animalia
- Phylum: Arthropoda
- Class: Insecta
- Order: Coleoptera
- Suborder: Polyphaga
- Infraorder: Cucujiformia
- Family: Cerambycidae
- Genus: Pteridotelus
- Species: P. laticornis

Binomial name
- Pteridotelus laticornis White, 1855

Species of beetle

Pteridotelus laticornis is a species of beetle in the family Cerambycidae. It was described by White in 1855.
