= Taurorcus =

Scientific classification
- Kingdom: Animalia
- Phylum: Arthropoda
- Class: Insecta
- Order: Coleoptera
- Suborder: Polyphaga
- Infraorder: Cucujiformia
- Family: Cerambycidae
- Tribe: Acanthoderini
- Genus: Taurorcus

Genus of beetle

Taurorcus is a genus of beetles in the family Cerambycidae, containing the following species:

- Taurorcus chabrillacii Thomson, 1857
- Taurorcus mourei Marinoni, 1969
