= Irundisaua moacyri =

Scientific classification
- Domain: Eukaryota
- Kingdom: Animalia
- Phylum: Arthropoda
- Class: Insecta
- Order: Coleoptera
- Suborder: Polyphaga
- Infraorder: Cucujiformia
- Family: Cerambycidae
- Genus: Irundisaua
- Species: I. moacyri

Binomial name
- Irundisaua moacyri (Julio, 2003)

Species of beetle

Irundisaua moacyri is a species of beetle in the family Cerambycidae. It was described by Julio in 2003.
