= Amblysaphes =

Scientific classification
- Domain: Eukaryota
- Kingdom: Animalia
- Phylum: Arthropoda
- Class: Insecta
- Order: Coleoptera
- Suborder: Polyphaga
- Infraorder: Cucujiformia
- Family: Cerambycidae
- Tribe: Acanthoderini
- Genus: Amblysaphes
- Species: A. striatus

Binomial name
- Amblysaphes striatus Bates, 1885

Genus of beetles

Amblysaphes striatus is a species of beetle in the family Cerambycidae, the only species in the genus Amblysaphes.
