= Spinozotroctes =

Scientific classification
- Kingdom: Animalia
- Phylum: Arthropoda
- Class: Insecta
- Order: Coleoptera
- Suborder: Polyphaga
- Infraorder: Cucujiformia
- Family: Cerambycidae
- Tribe: Acanthoderini
- Genus: Spinozotroctes

Genus of beetles

Spinozotroctes is a genus of beetles in the family Cerambycidae, containing the following species:

- Spinozotroctes seraisorum Tavakilian & Neouze, 2007
- Spinozotroctes thouvenoti Tavakilian & Neouze, 2007
