= Plagiosarus binoculus =

Scientific classification
- Kingdom: Animalia
- Phylum: Arthropoda
- Class: Insecta
- Order: Coleoptera
- Suborder: Polyphaga
- Infraorder: Cucujiformia
- Family: Cerambycidae
- Genus: Plagiosarus
- Species: P. binoculus

Binomial name
- Plagiosarus binoculus Bates, 1880

Species of beetle

Plagiosarus binoculus is a species of beetle in the family Cerambycidae. It was described by Henry Walter Bates in 1880.
