= Nesozineus =

Scientific classification
- Kingdom: Animalia
- Phylum: Arthropoda
- Class: Insecta
- Order: Coleoptera
- Suborder: Polyphaga
- Infraorder: Cucujiformia
- Family: Cerambycidae
- Subfamily: Lamiinae
- Tribe: Acanthoderini
- Genus: Nesozineus; Linsley & Chemsak, 1966

Genus of beetles

Nesozineus is a genus of beetles in the family Cerambycidae, containing the following species:

- Nesozineus alphoides (Lane, 1977)
- Nesozineus amazonicus Martins & Galileo, 2010
- Nesozineus apharus Galileo & Martins, 1996
- Nesozineus armatus Galileo & Martins, 1996
- Nesozineus ateuchus Galileo & Martins, 1996
- Nesozineus bisignatus Hoffmann, 1984
- Nesozineus bucki (Breuning, 1954)
- Nesozineus clarkei Galileo & Martins, 2007
- Nesozineus fraterculus Hoffmann, 1984
- Nesozineus galapagoensis (Van Dyke, 1953)
- Nesozineus giesberti Galileo & Martins, 2007
- Nesozineus granosus Galileo & Martins, 1996
- Nesozineus griseolus Hoffmann, 1984
- Nesozineus juninensis (Lane, 1970)
- Nesozineus lineatus Galileo & Martins, 1996
- Nesozineus marmoratus Galileo & Martins, 1996
- Nesozineus obscurus Hoffmann, 1984
- Nesozineus peruanus Galileo & Martins, 2007
- Nesozineus probolus Galileo & Martins, 1996
- Nesozineus propinquus Hoffmann, 1984
- Nesozineus puru Galileo & Martins, 2007
- Nesozineus simile Galileo & Martins, 2006
- Nesozineus triviale Galileo & Martins, 1996
- Nesozineus unicolor Martins, Galileo & de-Oliveira, 2009
- Nesozineus zonatus Galileo & Martins, 1996
