= Scythropopsis melanostictica =

Scientific classification
- Kingdom: Animalia
- Phylum: Arthropoda
- Class: Insecta
- Order: Coleoptera
- Suborder: Polyphaga
- Infraorder: Cucujiformia
- Family: Cerambycidae
- Genus: Scythropopsis
- Species: S. melanostictica

Binomial name
- Scythropopsis melanostictica (White, 1855)

Synonyms
- Acanthoderes melanosticticus White, 1855; Pteridotelus Contaminatus Thomson, 1865; Acanthoderes melanosticta Gemminger & Harold, 1873 (misspelling); Psapharochrus melanosticticus (White, 1855); Psapharochrus melanostictus Auctt. (misspelling)

Species of beetle

Scythropopsis melanostictica is a species of beetle in the family Cerambycidae. It was described by White in 1855.
