= Nesozineus granosus =

Scientific classification
- Kingdom: Animalia
- Phylum: Arthropoda
- Class: Insecta
- Order: Coleoptera
- Suborder: Polyphaga
- Infraorder: Cucujiformia
- Family: Cerambycidae
- Genus: Nesozineus
- Species: N. granosus

Binomial name
- Nesozineus granosus Galileo & Martins, 1996

Species of beetle

Nesozineus granosus is a species of beetle in the family Cerambycidae. It was described by Galileo and Martins in 1996.
