= Cotycicuiara =

Scientific classification
- Kingdom: Animalia
- Phylum: Arthropoda
- Class: Insecta
- Order: Coleoptera
- Suborder: Polyphaga
- Infraorder: Cucujiformia
- Family: Cerambycidae
- Subfamily: Lamiinae
- Tribe: Acanthoderini
- Genus: Cotycicuiara; Galileo & Martins, 2008

Genus of beetles

Cotycicuiara is a genus of longhorn beetles of the subfamily Lamiinae, containing the following species:

- Cotycicuiara alternata Galileo & Martins, 2008
- Cotycicuiara bahiensis Galileo & Martins, 2008
- Cotycicuiara boliviana Galileo & Martins, 2008
- Cotycicuiara latifascia Galileo & Martins, 2008
- Cotycicuiara multifasciata Galileo & Martins, 2008
- Cotycicuiara venezuelensis Galileo & Martins, 2008
