= Irundisaua balteata =

Scientific classification
- Domain: Eukaryota
- Kingdom: Animalia
- Phylum: Arthropoda
- Class: Insecta
- Order: Coleoptera
- Suborder: Polyphaga
- Infraorder: Cucujiformia
- Family: Cerambycidae
- Genus: Irundisaua
- Species: I. balteata

Binomial name
- Irundisaua balteata (Lane, 1972)

Species of beetle

Irundisaua balteata is a species of beetle in the family Cerambycidae. It was described by Lane in 1972.
