= Taurorcus chabrillacii =

Scientific classification
- Kingdom: Animalia
- Phylum: Arthropoda
- Clade: Pancrustacea
- Class: Insecta
- Order: Coleoptera
- Suborder: Polyphaga
- Infraorder: Cucujiformia
- Family: Cerambycidae
- Genus: Taurorcus
- Species: T. chabrillacii

Binomial name
- Taurorcus chabrillacii Thomson, 1857

Species of beetle

Taurorcus chabrillacii is a species of beetle in the family Cerambycidae. It was described by Thomson in 1857. It is found in Brazil (Minas Gerais, Rio de Janeiro, Paraná, Santa Catarina, Rio Grande do Sul) and Argentina (Misiones).
