= Sychnomerus hirticornis =

Scientific classification
- Kingdom: Animalia
- Phylum: Arthropoda
- Class: Insecta
- Order: Coleoptera
- Suborder: Polyphaga
- Infraorder: Cucujiformia
- Family: Cerambycidae
- Genus: Sychnomerus
- Species: S. hirticornis

Binomial name
- Sychnomerus hirticornis Bates, 1885

Species of beetle

Sychnomerus hirticornis is a species of beetle in the family Cerambycidae. It was described by Henry Walter Bates in 1885.
