= Symperasmus affinis =

Scientific classification
- Domain: Eukaryota
- Kingdom: Animalia
- Phylum: Arthropoda
- Class: Insecta
- Order: Coleoptera
- Suborder: Polyphaga
- Infraorder: Cucujiformia
- Family: Cerambycidae
- Genus: Symperasmus
- Species: S. affinis

Binomial name
- Symperasmus affinis Thomson, 1865

Synonyms
- Acanthoderes flexistigma Bates, 1880; Acanthoderes affinis (Thomson, 1865)

Species of beetle

Symperasmus affinis is a species of beetle in the family Cerambycidae. It was described by Thomson in 1865.
