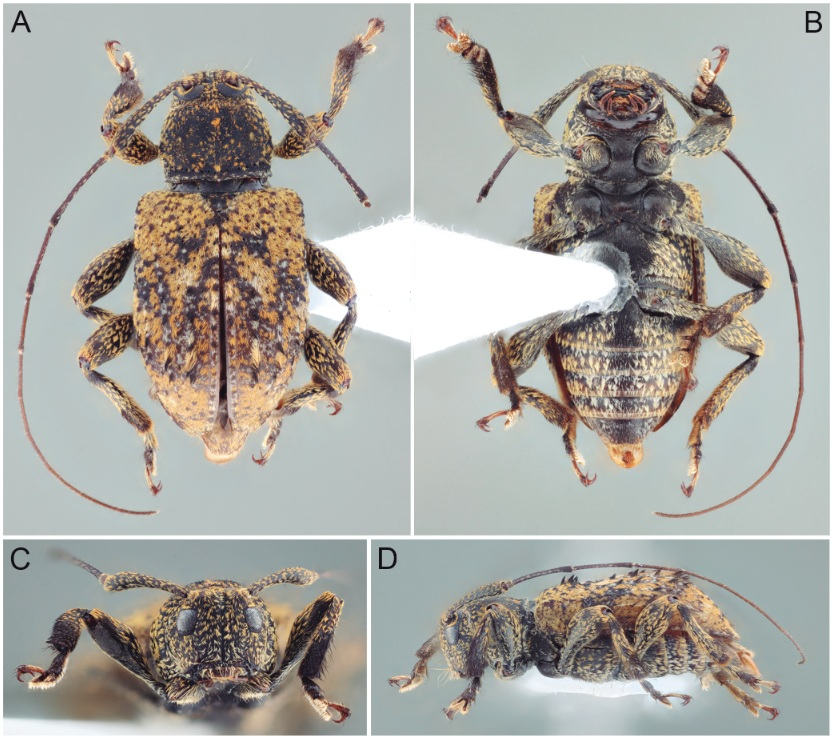

Scientific classification
- Kingdom: Animalia
- Phylum: Arthropoda
- Clade: Pancrustacea
- Class: Insecta
- Order: Coleoptera
- Suborder: Polyphaga
- Infraorder: Cucujiformia
- Family: Cerambycidae
- Subfamily: Lamiinae
- Tribe: Acanthoderini
- Genus: Criopsis; Thomson, 1861
- Species: C. curta

Binomial name
- Criopsis curta Thomson, 1861

Synonyms
- Criopsis curtus

= Criopsis =

Genus of beetles

Criopsis curta is a species of beetle in the family Cerambycidae, the only species in the genus Criopsis. It is found in Brazil (Minas Gerais, Espirito Santo, Rio de Janeiro, São Paulo, Paraná, Santa Catarina) and Paraguay.
