= Scythropopsis wappesi =

Scientific classification
- Kingdom: Animalia
- Phylum: Arthropoda
- Class: Insecta
- Order: Coleoptera
- Suborder: Polyphaga
- Infraorder: Cucujiformia
- Family: Cerambycidae
- Genus: Scythropopsis
- Species: S. wappesi

Binomial name
- Scythropopsis wappesi (Chemsak & Hovore, 2002)

Synonyms
- Acanthoderes wappesi Chemsak & Hovore, 2002

Species of beetle

Scythropopsis wappesi is a species of beetle in the family Cerambycidae, described by Chemsak and Hovore in 2002.
