= Symperasmus alboniger =

Scientific classification
- Kingdom: Animalia
- Phylum: Arthropoda
- Class: Insecta
- Order: Coleoptera
- Suborder: Polyphaga
- Infraorder: Cucujiformia
- Family: Cerambycidae
- Genus: Symperasmus
- Species: S. alboniger

Binomial name
- Symperasmus alboniger (Bates, 1861)

Synonyms
- Acanthoderes alboniger Bates, 1861; Acanthoderes albomaculata Fuchs, 1963; Acanthoderes griseomaculata Zajciw, 1971; Psapharochrus alboniger (Bates, 1861); Psapharochrus albomaculatus (Fuchs, 1963); Psapharochrus griseomaculatus (Zajciw, 1971)

Species of beetle

Symperasmus alboniger is a species of beetle in the family Cerambycidae. It was described by Bates in 1861.
