= Meridiotroctes bicristata =

Scientific classification
- Kingdom: Animalia
- Phylum: Arthropoda
- Class: Insecta
- Order: Coleoptera
- Suborder: Polyphaga
- Infraorder: Cucujiformia
- Family: Cerambycidae
- Genus: Meridiotroctes
- Species: M. bicristata

Binomial name
- Meridiotroctes bicristata Machado & Monné, 2009

Species of beetle

Meridiotroctes bicristata is a species of beetle in the family Cerambycidae. It was described by Vanessa S. Machado and Marcela L. Monné in 2009.
