= Scythropopsis albitarsis =

Scientific classification
- Kingdom: Animalia
- Phylum: Arthropoda
- Class: Insecta
- Order: Coleoptera
- Suborder: Polyphaga
- Infraorder: Cucujiformia
- Family: Cerambycidae
- Genus: Scythropopsis
- Species: S. albitarsis

Binomial name
- Scythropopsis albitarsis (Laporte, 1840)

Synonyms
- Acanthoderus albitarsis Laporte, 1840

Species of beetle

Scythropopsis albitarsis is a species of beetle in the family Cerambycidae. It was described by Laporte in 1840.
