= Exalphus leuconotus =

Scientific classification
- Domain: Eukaryota
- Kingdom: Animalia
- Phylum: Arthropoda
- Class: Insecta
- Order: Coleoptera
- Suborder: Polyphaga
- Infraorder: Cucujiformia
- Family: Cerambycidae
- Genus: Exalphus
- Species: E. leuconotus

Binomial name
- Exalphus leuconotus (Thomson, 1860)

Species of beetle

Exalphus leuconotus is a species of beetle in the family Cerambycidae. It was described by Thomson in 1860.
