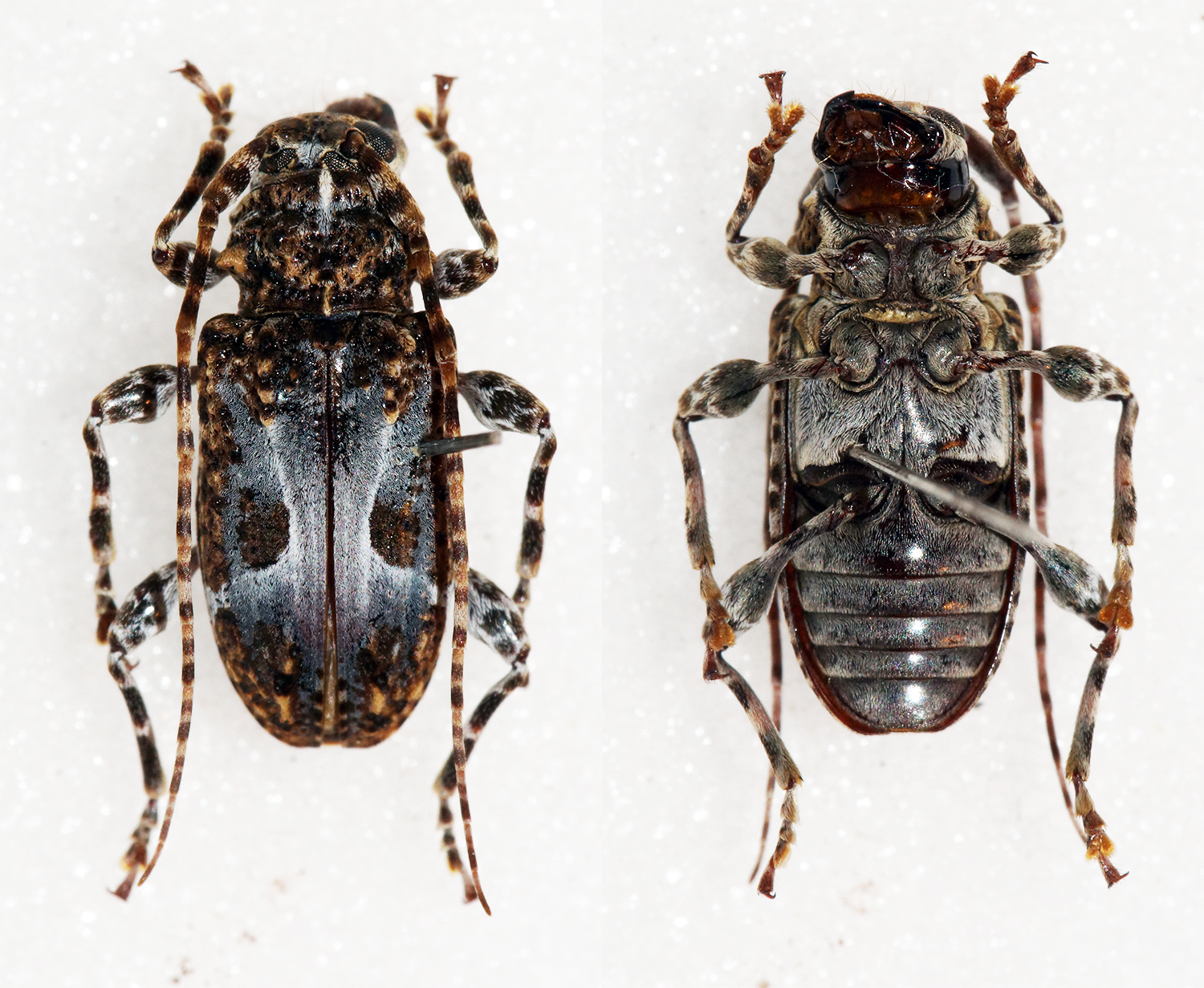
- Male Exalphus biannulatus beetle

Scientific classification
- Domain: Eukaryota
- Kingdom: Animalia
- Phylum: Arthropoda
- Class: Insecta
- Order: Coleoptera
- Suborder: Polyphaga
- Infraorder: Cucujiformia
- Family: Cerambycidae
- Subfamily: Lamiinae
- Tribe: Acanthoderini
- Genus: Exalphus; Restello, Iannuzzi & Marinoni, 2001

Type species
- Exalphus leuconotus Thomson, 1860

= Exalphus =

Genus of insects

Exalphus is a genus of beetles in the family Cerambycidae.

== Species ==
Exalphus contains the following species:

- Exalphus aurivillii (Lane, 1970)
- Exalphus biannulatus (Aurivillius, 1921)
- Exalphus cavifrons (Bates, 1872)
- Exalphus cicatricornis Schmid, 2014
- Exalphus colasi (Lane, 1965)
- Exalphus confusus Restello, 2001
- Exalphus docquini Tavakilian & Neouze, 2013
- Exalphus foveatus (Marinoni & Martins, 1978)
- Exalphus gounellei (Lane, 1973)
- Exalphus guaraniticus (Lane, 1955)
- Exalphus leuconotus (Thomson, 1860)
- Exalphus lichenophorus (Lane, 1965)
- Exalphus malleri (Lane, 1955)
- Exalphus simplex (Galileo & Martins, 1998)
- Exalphus solangae Santana & Monne, 2014
- Exalphus spilonotus Restello, 2001
- Exalphus vicinus Galileo & Martins, 2003
- Exalphus zellibori (Lane, 1955)
