= Scythropopsis cornuta =

Scientific classification
- Kingdom: Animalia
- Phylum: Arthropoda
- Class: Insecta
- Order: Coleoptera
- Suborder: Polyphaga
- Infraorder: Cucujiformia
- Family: Cerambycidae
- Genus: Scythropopsis
- Species: S. cornuta

Binomial name
- Scythropopsis cornuta (Bates, 1880)

Synonyms
- Acanthoderes cornutus Bates, 1880; Psapharochrus cornutus (Bates, 1880)

Species of beetle

Scythropopsis cornuta is a species of beetle in the family Cerambycidae. It was described by Henry Walter Bates in 1880.
