= Peritapnia =

Scientific classification
- Kingdom: Animalia
- Phylum: Arthropoda
- Class: Insecta
- Order: Coleoptera
- Suborder: Polyphaga
- Infraorder: Cucujiformia
- Family: Cerambycidae
- Subfamily: Lamiinae
- Tribe: Acanthoderini
- Genus: Peritapnia; Horn, 1894

Genus of beetles

Peritapnia is a genus of beetles in the family Cerambycidae, containing the following species:

- Peritapnia fabra Horn, 1894
- Peritapnia minima Chemsak & Linsley, 1978
- Peritapnia nudicornis (Bates, 1885)
- Peritapnia pilosa Chemsak & Linsley, 1978
