= Cotycicuiara latifascia =

Scientific classification
- Kingdom: Animalia
- Phylum: Arthropoda
- Class: Insecta
- Order: Coleoptera
- Suborder: Polyphaga
- Infraorder: Cucujiformia
- Family: Cerambycidae
- Genus: Cotycicuiara
- Species: C. latifascia

Binomial name
- Cotycicuiara latifascia Galileo & Martins, 2008

Species of beetle

Cotycicuiara latifascia is a species of beetle in the family Cerambycidae. It was described by Galileo and Martins in 2008. It is known from Bolivia.
