= Pteridotelus pupillatus =

Scientific classification
- Kingdom: Animalia
- Phylum: Arthropoda
- Class: Insecta
- Order: Coleoptera
- Suborder: Polyphaga
- Infraorder: Cucujiformia
- Family: Cerambycidae
- Genus: Pteridotelus
- Species: P. pupillatus

Binomial name
- Pteridotelus pupillatus Lacordaire, 1872

Species of beetle

Pteridotelus pupillatus is a species of beetle in the family Cerambycidae. It was described by Lacordaire in 1872.
