= Punctozotroctes inhamum =

Scientific classification
- Kingdom: Animalia
- Phylum: Arthropoda
- Class: Insecta
- Order: Coleoptera
- Suborder: Polyphaga
- Infraorder: Cucujiformia
- Family: Cerambycidae
- Genus: Punctozotroctes
- Species: P. inhamum

Binomial name
- Punctozotroctes inhamum Martins, Galileo & Limeira-de-Olveira, 2009

Species of beetle

Punctozotroctes inhamum is a species of beetle in the family Cerambycidae. It was described by Martins, Galileo and Limeira-de-Olveira in 2009.
