= Pyrianoreina =

Scientific classification
- Kingdom: Animalia
- Phylum: Arthropoda
- Class: Insecta
- Order: Coleoptera
- Suborder: Polyphaga
- Infraorder: Cucujiformia
- Family: Cerambycidae
- Tribe: Acanthoderini
- Genus: Pyrianoreina

Genus of beetles

Pyrianoreina is a genus of beetles in the family Cerambycidae, containing the following species:

- Pyrianoreina hovorei Martins & Galileo, 2008
- Pyrianoreina piranga Martins & Galileo, 2008
