= Anoreina piara =

Scientific classification
- Domain: Eukaryota
- Kingdom: Animalia
- Phylum: Arthropoda
- Class: Insecta
- Order: Coleoptera
- Suborder: Polyphaga
- Infraorder: Cucujiformia
- Family: Cerambycidae
- Genus: Anoreina
- Species: A. piara

Binomial name
- Anoreina piara Martins & Galileo, 2008

Species of beetle

Anoreina piara is a species of beetle in the family Cerambycidae. It was described by Martins and Galileo in 2008.
