= Anoreina =

Scientific classification
- Domain: Eukaryota
- Kingdom: Animalia
- Phylum: Arthropoda
- Class: Insecta
- Order: Coleoptera
- Suborder: Polyphaga
- Infraorder: Cucujiformia
- Family: Cerambycidae
- Tribe: Acanthoderini
- Genus: Anoreina

Genus of beetles

Anoreina is a genus of beetles in the family Cerambycidae, containing the following species:

- Anoreina ayri Martins & Galileo, 2008
- Anoreina biannulata (Bates, 1866)
- Anoreina helenae Machado & Monne, 2011
- Anoreina nana (Bates, 1861)
- Anoreina piara Martins & Galileo, 2008
- Anoreina roosevelti Machado & Monne, 2011
- Anoreina triangularis (Martins & Galileo, 2005)
