= Nesozineus bucki =

Scientific classification
- Kingdom: Animalia
- Phylum: Arthropoda
- Class: Insecta
- Order: Coleoptera
- Suborder: Polyphaga
- Infraorder: Cucujiformia
- Family: Cerambycidae
- Genus: Nesozineus
- Species: N. bucki

Binomial name
- Nesozineus bucki (Breuning, 1954)

Species of beetle

Nesozineus bucki is a species of beetle in the family Cerambycidae. It was described by Breuning in 1954.
