= Miguelmonneus =

Scientific classification
- Kingdom: Animalia
- Phylum: Arthropoda
- Class: Insecta
- Order: Coleoptera
- Suborder: Polyphaga
- Infraorder: Cucujiformia
- Family: Cerambycidae
- Genus: Miguelmonneus; Silva Júnior, Haseyama & Souza, 2021
- Species: M. insolitus

Binomial name
- Miguelmonneus insolitus (Monné, 2001)

Synonyms
- Plistonax insolitus Monné, 2001

Species of beetle

Miguelmonneus insolitus is a species of beetle in the family Cerambycidae. It was described by Monné in 2001 and moved into its own genus in 2021.
