= Catuana =

Catuana spinicornis

Scientific classification
- Kingdom: Animalia
- Phylum: Arthropoda
- Class: Insecta
- Order: Coleoptera
- Suborder: Polyphaga
- Infraorder: Cucujiformia
- Family: Cerambycidae
- Genus: Catuana
- Species: C. spinicornis

Binomial name
- Catuana spinicornis (Tippmann, 1960)

Genus of beetles

Catuana spinicornis is a species of beetle in the family Cerambycidae, the only species in the genus Catuana.
