= Trichoanoreina =

Scientific classification
- Kingdom: Animalia
- Phylum: Arthropoda
- Class: Insecta
- Order: Coleoptera
- Suborder: Polyphaga
- Infraorder: Cucujiformia
- Family: Cerambycidae
- Genus: Trichoanoreina
- Species: T. albomaculata

Binomial name
- Trichoanoreina albomaculata Julio & Monne, 2005

Genus of beetles

Trichoanoreina albomaculata is a species of beetle in the family Cerambycidae, and the only species in the genus Trichoanoreina. It was described by Julio and Monne in 2005.
