= Itajutinga =

Itajutinga difficilis

Scientific classification
- Kingdom: Animalia
- Phylum: Arthropoda
- Class: Insecta
- Order: Coleoptera
- Suborder: Polyphaga
- Infraorder: Cucujiformia
- Family: Cerambycidae
- Genus: Itajutinga
- Species: I. difficilis

Binomial name
- Itajutinga difficilis Martins, 1981

Genus of beetles

Itajutinga difficilis is a species of beetle in the family Cerambycidae, the only species in the genus Itajutinga.
