= Mundeu =

Mundeu maculicollis

Scientific classification
- Kingdom: Animalia
- Phylum: Arthropoda
- Class: Insecta
- Order: Coleoptera
- Suborder: Polyphaga
- Infraorder: Cucujiformia
- Family: Cerambycidae
- Genus: Mundeu
- Species: M. maculicollis

Binomial name
- Mundeu maculicollis (Bates, 1861)

Genus of beetles

Mundeu maculicollis is a species of beetle in the family Cerambycidae, the only species in the genus Mundeu.
