= Formozotroctes =

Formozotroctes toulgoeti

Scientific classification
- Kingdom: Animalia
- Phylum: Arthropoda
- Class: Insecta
- Order: Coleoptera
- Suborder: Polyphaga
- Infraorder: Cucujiformia
- Family: Cerambycidae
- Genus: Formozotroctes
- Species: F. toulgoeti

Binomial name
- Formozotroctes toulgoeti Tavakilian & Neouze, 2007

Genus of beetles

Formozotroctes toulgoeti is a species of beetle in the family Cerambycidae, the only species in the genus Formozotroctes.
