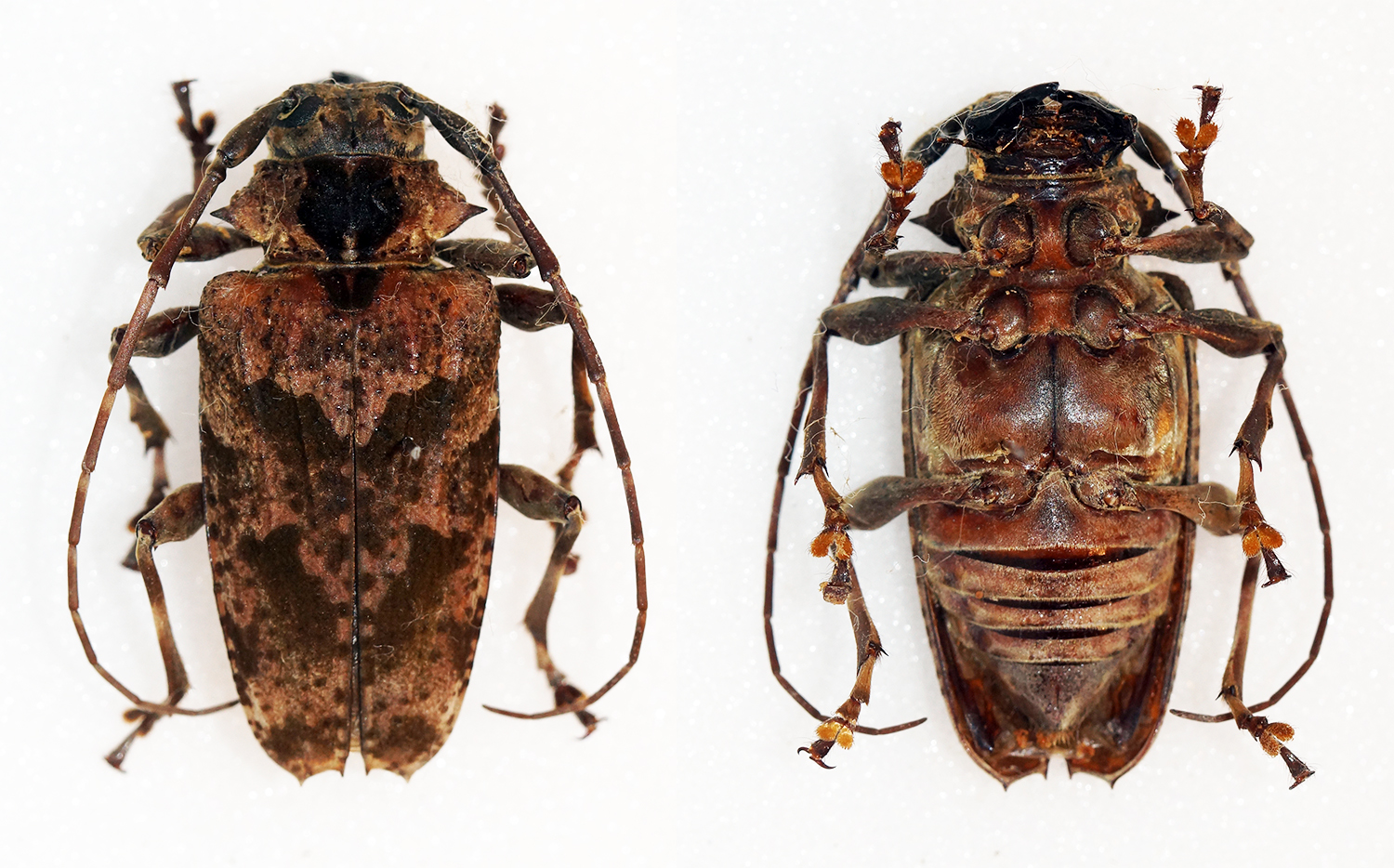

Scientific classification
- Kingdom: Animalia
- Phylum: Arthropoda
- Class: Insecta
- Order: Coleoptera
- Suborder: Polyphaga
- Infraorder: Cucujiformia
- Family: Cerambycidae
- Genus: Dryoctenes
- Species: D. scrupulosus

Binomial name
- Dryoctenes scrupulosus (Germar, 1824)

= Dryoctenes =

Dryoctenes scrupulosus

Genus of beetles

Dryoctenes scrupulosus is a species of beetle in the family Cerambycidae, the only species in the genus Dryoctenes.
