= Paradiscopus =

Scientific classification
- Kingdom: Animalia
- Phylum: Arthropoda
- Class: Insecta
- Order: Coleoptera
- Suborder: Polyphaga
- Infraorder: Cucujiformia
- Family: Cerambycidae
- Genus: Paradiscopus
- Species: P. maculatus

Binomial name
- Paradiscopus maculatus Schwarzer, 1930

Genus of beetles

Paradiscopus maculatus is a species of beetle in the family Cerambycidae, and the only species in the genus Paradiscopus. It was described by Schwarzer in 1930.
