= Pycnomorphidiellus =

Scientific classification
- Kingdom: Animalia
- Phylum: Arthropoda
- Class: Insecta
- Order: Coleoptera
- Suborder: Polyphaga
- Infraorder: Cucujiformia
- Family: Cerambycidae
- Genus: Pycnomorphidiellus
- Species: P. polyphagus

Binomial name
- Pycnomorphidiellus polyphagus Tavakilian & Peñaherrera-Leiva, 2003

Genus of beetles

Pycnomorphidiellus polyphagus is a species of beetle in the family Cerambycidae, and the only species in the genus Pycnomorphidiellus. It was described by Tavakilian and Peñaherrera-Leiva in 2003.
