= Exalphus spilonotus =

Scientific classification
- Domain: Eukaryota
- Kingdom: Animalia
- Phylum: Arthropoda
- Class: Insecta
- Order: Coleoptera
- Suborder: Polyphaga
- Infraorder: Cucujiformia
- Family: Cerambycidae
- Genus: Exalphus
- Species: E. spilonotus

Binomial name
- Exalphus spilonotus Restello, 2001

Species of beetle

Exalphus spilonotus is a species of beetle in the family Cerambycidae. It was described by Restello in 2001.
