= Pseudotapnia =

Scientific classification
- Kingdom: Animalia
- Phylum: Arthropoda
- Class: Insecta
- Order: Coleoptera
- Suborder: Polyphaga
- Infraorder: Cucujiformia
- Family: Cerambycidae
- Genus: Pseudotapnia
- Species: P. curticornis

Binomial name
- Pseudotapnia curticornis Chemsak & Linsley, 1978

Genus of beetles

Pseudotapnia curticornis is a species of beetle in the family Cerambycidae, and the only species in the genus Pseudotapnia. It was described by Chemsak and Linsley in 1978.
