= Octotapnia =

Scientific classification
- Kingdom: Animalia
- Phylum: Arthropoda
- Class: Insecta
- Order: Coleoptera
- Suborder: Polyphaga
- Infraorder: Cucujiformia
- Family: Cerambycidae
- Subfamily: Lamiinae
- Genus: Octotapnia

Genus of beetles

Octotapnia is a genus of beetles in the family Cerambycidae, containing the following species:

- Octotapnia ceiaca Galileo & Martins, 1998
- Octotapnia exotica Galileo & Martins, 1992
- Octotapnia mucunaca Galileo & Martins, 1998
