= Miriochrus =

Miriochrus minimus

Scientific classification
- Kingdom: Animalia
- Phylum: Arthropoda
- Class: Insecta
- Order: Coleoptera
- Suborder: Polyphaga
- Infraorder: Cucujiformia
- Family: Cerambycidae
- Genus: Miriochrus
- Species: M. minimus

Binomial name
- Miriochrus minimus Galileo & Martins, 2012

Genus of beetles

Miriochrus minimus is a species of beetle in the family Cerambycidae, the only species in the genus Miriochrus.
