= Cotyzineus =

Cotyzineus bruchi

Scientific classification
- Kingdom: Animalia
- Phylum: Arthropoda
- Clade: Pancrustacea
- Class: Insecta
- Order: Coleoptera
- Suborder: Polyphaga
- Infraorder: Cucujiformia
- Family: Cerambycidae
- Genus: Cotyzineus
- Species: C. bruchi

Binomial name
- Cotyzineus bruchi (Melzer, 1931)

Genus of beetles

Cotyzineus bruchi is a species of beetle in the family Cerambycidae, the only species in the genus Cotyzineus.
