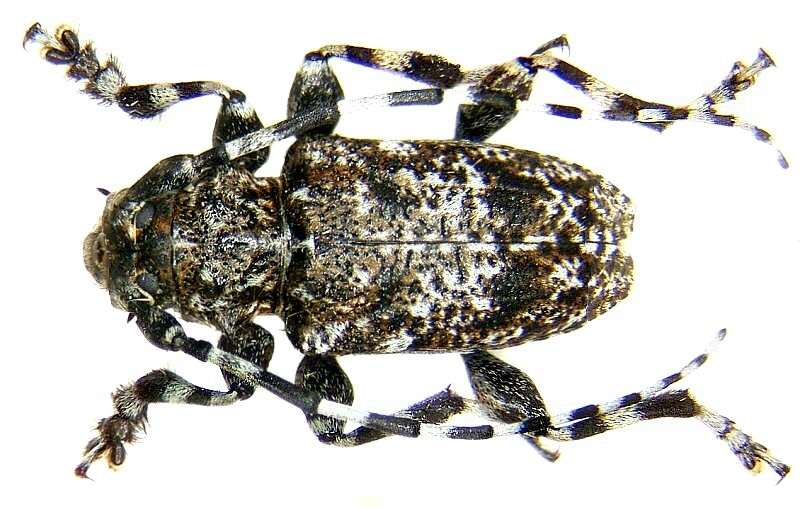
- Aegomorphus clavipes

Scientific classification
- Kingdom: Animalia
- Phylum: Arthropoda
- Class: Insecta
- Order: Coleoptera
- Suborder: Polyphaga
- Infraorder: Cucujiformia
- Family: Cerambycidae
- Tribe: Acanthoderini
- Genus: Aegomorphus; Haldeman, 1847

Synonyms
- Acanthoderes Haldeman, 1847 (nec Acanthoderes Audinet-Serville, 1835); Psapharochrus Thomson, 1864; Aethiopoctines Thomson, 1868; Aegoschema Knull, 1946 (nec Aegoschema Aurivillius, 1923)

= Aegomorphus =

Genus of beetles

Aegomorphus is a large genus of beetles in the family Cerambycidae.

== Taxonomy ==
Most of the species presently in Aegomorphus were originally placed in the genus Acanthoderes, or (more recently) under the invalid name Psapharochrus, which was a subgenus of Acanthoderes for much of its history, and later elevated to genus rank before it was determined (in 2020) to be a junior synonym of Aegomorphus.

== Species ==
- Aegomorphus albosignus Chemsak & Noguera, 1993
- Aegomorphus antonkozlovi Santos-Silva, Nascimento & Silva Junior, 2020
- Aegomorphus arietis (Bates, 1885)
- Aegomorphus arizonicus Linsley & Chemsak, 1984
- Aegomorphus atrosignatus (Melzer, 1932)
- Aegomorphus bezarki (Santos-Silva & Galileo, 2016)
- Aegomorphus bicuspis (Germar, 1823)
- Aegomorphus bimaculatus (Fuchs, 1958)
- Aegomorphus binocularis (Martins, 1981)
- Aegomorphus bivitta (White, 1855)
- Aegomorphus borrei (Dugés, 1885)
- Aegomorphus brevicornis (Zajciw, 1964)
- Aegomorphus brunnescens (Zajciw, 1963)
- Aegomorphus carinicollis (Bates, 1880)
- Aegomorphus cerdai (Tavakilian & Neouze, 2013)
- Aegomorphus chamelae Chemsak & Giesbert, 1986
- Aegomorphus chrysopus (Bates, 1861)
- Aegomorphus circumflexus (Jacquelin du Val in Sagra, 1857)
- Aegomorphus clavipes (Schrank, 1781)
- Aegomorphus clericus (Bates, 1880)
- Aegomorphus comptus (Marinoni & Martins, 1978)
- Aegomorphus conifera (Zajciw, 1963)
- Aegomorphus consentaneus (Thomson, 1865)
- Aegomorphus contaminatus (Thomson, 1865)
- Aegomorphus corticarius (Tippmann, 1960)
- Aegomorphus crocostigma (Bates, 1880)
- Aegomorphus cylindricus (Bates, 1861)
- Aegomorphus doctus (Bates, 1880)
- Aegomorphus excellens (Zajciw, 1964)
- Aegomorphus flavitarsis (Fuchs, 1962)
- Aegomorphus francottei Sama 1994
- Aegomorphus galapagoensis (Linell, 1899)
- Aegomorphus geminus Galileo & Martins, 2012
- Aegomorphus gigas Galileo & Martins, 2012
- Aegomorphus grisescens (Pic, 1897)
- Aegomorphus hebes (Bates, 1861)
- Aegomorphus homonymus (Blackwelder, 1946)
- Aegomorphus inquinatus (Bates, 1872)
- Aegomorphus irumus Galileo & Martins, 2011
- Aegomorphus itatiayensis (Melzer, 1935)
- Aegomorphus jaspideus (Germar, 1824)
- Aegomorphus juno (Fisher, 1938)
- Aegomorphus krueperi (Kraatz, 1859)
- Aegomorphus laetificus (Bates, 1880)
- Aegomorphus lanei (Marinoni & Martins, 1978)
- Aegomorphus langeri (Martins, Santos-Silva & Galileo, 2015)
- Aegomorphus lateralis (Bates, 1861)
- Aegomorphus leucodryas (Bates, 1880)
- Aegomorphus longipennis (Zajciw, 1963)
- Aegomorphus longispinis (Bates, 1861)
- Aegomorphus longitarsis (Bates, 1880)
- Aegomorphus lotor (White, 1855)
- Aegomorphus luctuosus (Bates, 1880)
- Aegomorphus maccartyi (Chemsak & Hovore, 2002)
- Aegomorphus maculatissimus (Bates, 1861)
- Aegomorphus magnus (Marinoni & Martins, 1978)
- Aegomorphus meleagris (Bates, 1861)
- Aegomorphus mexicanus Martins, Santos-Silva & Galileo 2015
- Aegomorphus modestus (Gyllenhal in Schoenherr, 1817)
- Aegomorphus morrisi (Uhler, 1855)
- Aegomorphus mourei (Zajciw, 1964)
- Aegomorphus nearnsi Martins & Galileo, 2010
- Aegomorphus nigricans (Lameere, 1884)
- Aegomorphus nigromaculatus (Fuchs, 1962)
- Aegomorphus nigropunctatus (Tippmann, 1960)
- Aegomorphus nigrovittatus (Zajciw, 1969)
- Aegomorphus obscurior (Pic, 1904)
- Aegomorphus pantherinus (Tavakilian & Neouze, 2013)
- Aegomorphus peninsularis (Horn, 1880)
- Aegomorphus penrosei (Chemsak & Hovore, 2002)
- Aegomorphus pereirai (Prosen & Lane, 1955)
- Aegomorphus peritapnioides (Linsley, 1958)
- Aegomorphus phasianus (Bates, 1861)
- Aegomorphus pictus Galileo & Martins, 2012
- Aegomorphus pigmentatus (Bates, 1861)
- Aegomorphus pinima Galileo & Martins, 2006
- Aegomorphus piperatus (Gahan, 1892)
- Aegomorphus piraiuba Martins & Galileo, 2004
- Aegomorphus polystictus (Bates, 1885)
- Aegomorphus pseudosatellinus (Tavakilian & Neouze, 2013)
- Aegomorphus purulensis (Bates, 1885)
- Aegomorphus quadrigibbus (Say, 1831)
- Aegomorphus ramirezi (Chemsak & Hovore, 2002)
- Aegomorphus ridleyi (Waterhouse, 1894)
- Aegomorphus rileyi (Tavakilian & Neouze, 2013)
- Aegomorphus robustus Santos-Silva, Botero & Wappes, 2020
- Aegomorphus rufitarsis (Kirsch, 1889)
- Aegomorphus satellinus (Erichson, 1847)
- Aegomorphus schmithi (Melzer, 1935)
- Aegomorphus signatifrons (Zajciw, 1964)
- Aegomorphus signatus (Gahan, 1892)
- Aegomorphus socorroensis (Linsley, 1942)
- Aegomorphus travassosi (Monné & Magno, 1992)
- Aegomorphus umbratus (Bates, 1885)
- Aegomorphus vetustus (Bates, 1880)
- Aegomorphus wappesi (Galileo, Martins & Santos-Silva, 2015)
