= Acakyra =

Scientific classification
- Kingdom: Animalia
- Phylum: Arthropoda
- Clade: Pancrustacea
- Class: Insecta
- Order: Coleoptera
- Suborder: Polyphaga
- Infraorder: Cucujiformia
- Family: Cerambycidae
- Tribe: Acanthoderini
- Genus: Acakyra; Martins & Galileo, 1996

Genus of beetles

Acakyra is a genus of beetles in the family Cerambycidae. It is distributed in Central America and northern South America, from Costa Rica to Ecuador and Peru.

== Species ==
There are six recognized species:

- Acakyra crocostigma (Bates, 1880)
- Acakyra iaguara Martins & Galileo, 1996
- Acakyra laterialba Martins & Galileo, 2001
- Acakyra nigrofasciata Martins & Galileo, 2001
- Acakyra ocellata Chemsak & Hovore, 2002
- Acakyra sinuata Vlasák & Santos-Silva, 2022
