= Aegomorphus borrei =

Scientific classification
- Kingdom: Animalia
- Phylum: Arthropoda
- Class: Insecta
- Order: Coleoptera
- Suborder: Polyphaga
- Infraorder: Cucujiformia
- Family: Cerambycidae
- Tribe: Acanthoderini
- Genus: Aegomorphus
- Species: A. borrei

Binomial name
- Aegomorphus borrei (Dugés, 1885)

Synonyms
- Acanthoderes Borrei Dugés, 1885; Psapharochrus borrei (Dugés, 1885)

Species of beetle

Aegomorphus borrei is a species of beetle in the family Cerambycidae. It was described by Dugés in 1885.
