= Aegomorphus satellinus =

Scientific classification
- Kingdom: Animalia
- Phylum: Arthropoda
- Class: Insecta
- Order: Coleoptera
- Suborder: Polyphaga
- Infraorder: Cucujiformia
- Family: Cerambycidae
- Tribe: Acanthoderini
- Genus: Aegomorphus
- Species: A. satellinus

Binomial name
- Aegomorphus satellinus (Erichson, 1847)

Synonyms
- Acanthoderes satellinus Erichson, 1847; Psapharochrus satellinus (Erichson, 1847)

Species of beetle

Aegomorphus satellinus is a species of beetle in the family Cerambycidae. It was described by Wilhelm Ferdinand Erichson in 1847.
