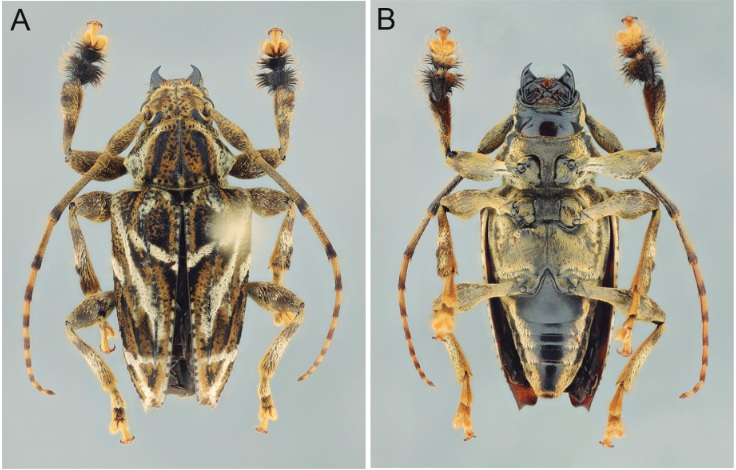

Scientific classification
- Kingdom: Animalia
- Phylum: Arthropoda
- Clade: Pancrustacea
- Class: Insecta
- Order: Coleoptera
- Suborder: Polyphaga
- Infraorder: Cucujiformia
- Family: Cerambycidae
- Tribe: Acanthoderini
- Genus: Aegomorphus
- Species: A. geminus

Binomial name
- Aegomorphus geminus (Galileo & Martins, 2012)

Synonyms
- Psapharochrus geminus Galileo & Martins, 2012

= Aegomorphus geminus =

Species of beetle

Aegomorphus geminus is a species of beetle in the family Cerambycidae. It was described by Galileo and Martins in 2012. It is found in Panama and Brazil (Minas Gerais, São Paulo).
