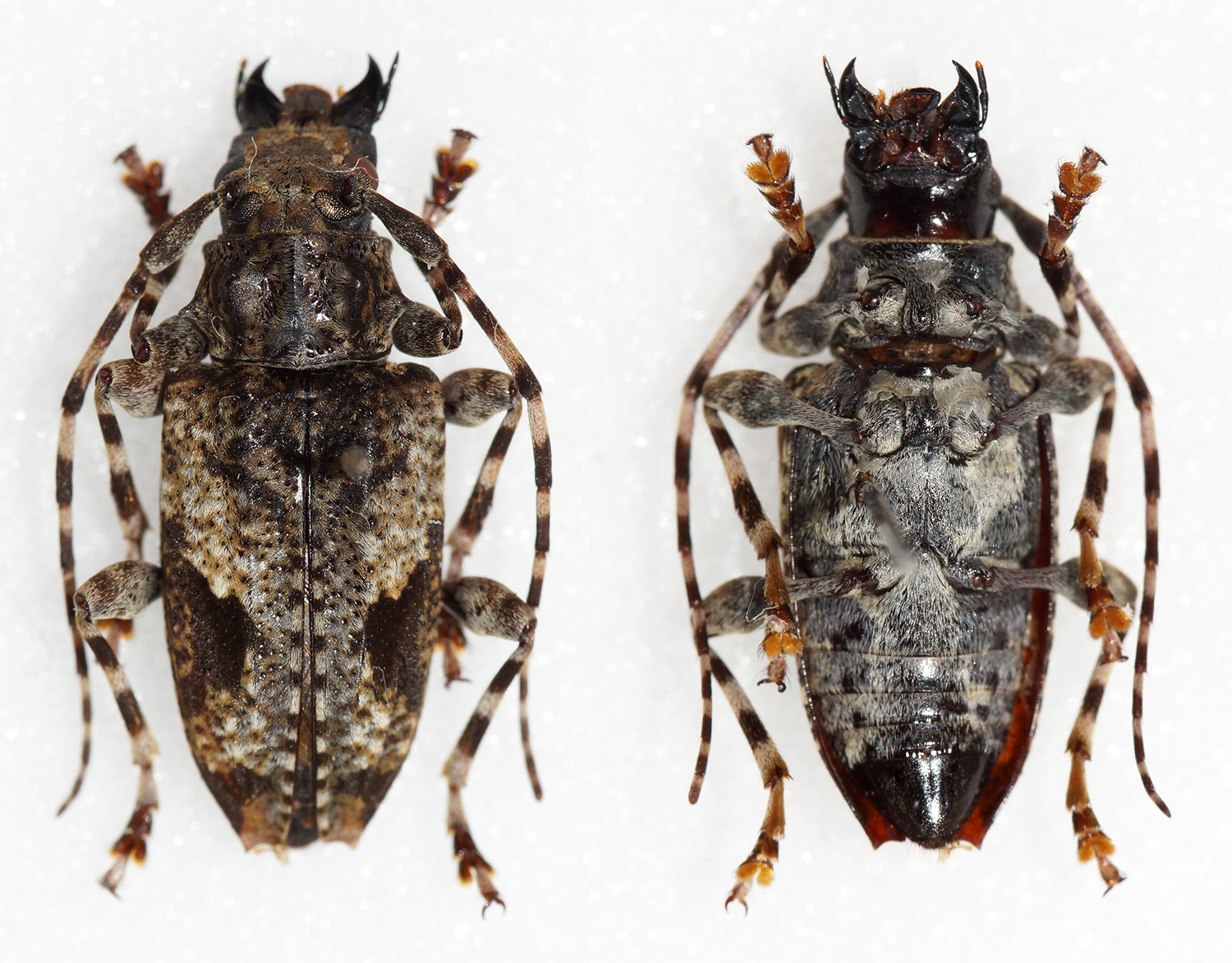

Scientific classification
- Kingdom: Animalia
- Phylum: Arthropoda
- Clade: Pancrustacea
- Class: Insecta
- Order: Coleoptera
- Suborder: Polyphaga
- Infraorder: Cucujiformia
- Family: Cerambycidae
- Tribe: Acanthoderini
- Genus: Aegomorphus
- Species: A. jaspideus

Binomial name
- Aegomorphus jaspideus (Germar, 1823)

Synonyms
- Lamia jaspidea Germar, 1824; Psapharochrus jaspideus (Germar, 1824); Acanthoderes jaspidea Germar, 1839; Acanthoderes jaspideus White, 1855; Acanthoderes congener Burmeister, 1865

= Aegomorphus jaspideus =

Species of beetle

Aegomorphus jaspideus is a species of beetle in the family Cerambycidae. It was described by Germar in 1823. It is found in Brazil (Pará, Maranhão, Pernambuco, Fernando de Noronha, Ceará, Bahia, Mato Grosso do Sul, Minas Gerais, Espírito Santo, Rio de Janeiro, São Paulo, Paraná, Santa Catarina, Rio Grande do Sul), Bolivia (Santa Cruz, Tarija), Paraguay, Chile, Argentina (Tucumán, Santiago del Estero, Córdoba, Mendoza, Misiones, Chaco, Santa Fé, Corrientes, Entre Ríos, Buenos Aires, La Pampa) and Uruguay.
