= Aegomorphus pigmentatus =

Scientific classification
- Kingdom: Animalia
- Phylum: Arthropoda
- Class: Insecta
- Order: Coleoptera
- Suborder: Polyphaga
- Infraorder: Cucujiformia
- Family: Cerambycidae
- Tribe: Acanthoderini
- Genus: Aegomorphus
- Species: A. pigmentatus

Binomial name
- Aegomorphus pigmentatus (Bates, 1861)

Synonyms
- Acanthoderes pigmentatus Bates, 1861; Acanthoderes pegmentata Zajciw, 1970 (misspelling); Psapharochrus pigmentatus (Bates, 1861)

Species of beetle

Aegomorphus pigmentatus is a species of beetle in the family Cerambycidae. It was described by Henry Walter Bates in 1861.
