= Aegomorphus nigropunctatus =

Scientific classification
- Kingdom: Animalia
- Phylum: Arthropoda
- Class: Insecta
- Order: Coleoptera
- Suborder: Polyphaga
- Infraorder: Cucujiformia
- Family: Cerambycidae
- Tribe: Acanthoderini
- Genus: Aegomorphus
- Species: A. nigropunctatus

Binomial name
- Aegomorphus nigropunctatus (Tippmann, 1960)

Synonyms
- Acanthoderes nigropunctata Tippmann, 1960; Psapharochrus nigropunctatus (Tippmann, 1960)

Species of beetle

Aegomorphus nigropunctatus is a species of beetle in the family Cerambycidae. It was described by Tippmann in 1960.
