= Aegomorphus itatiayensis =

Scientific classification
- Kingdom: Animalia
- Phylum: Arthropoda
- Class: Insecta
- Order: Coleoptera
- Suborder: Polyphaga
- Infraorder: Cucujiformia
- Family: Cerambycidae
- Tribe: Acanthoderini
- Genus: Aegomorphus
- Species: A. itatiayensis

Binomial name
- Aegomorphus itatiayensis (Melzer, 1935)

Synonyms
- Acanthoderes itatiayensis Melzer, 1935; Psapharochrus itatiayensis (Melzer, 1935)

Species of beetle

Aegomorphus itatiayensis is a species of beetle in the family Cerambycidae. It was described by Melzer in 1935. It is Brown.
