= Aegomorphus longispinis =

Scientific classification
- Kingdom: Animalia
- Phylum: Arthropoda
- Class: Insecta
- Order: Coleoptera
- Suborder: Polyphaga
- Infraorder: Cucujiformia
- Family: Cerambycidae
- Tribe: Acanthoderini
- Genus: Aegomorphus
- Species: A. longispinis

Binomial name
- Aegomorphus longispinis (Bates, 1861)

Synonyms
- Acanthoderes longispinis Bates, 1861; Psapharochrus longispinis (Bates, 1861)

Species of beetle

Aegomorphus longispinis is a species of beetle in the family Cerambycidae. It was described by Henry Walter Bates in 1861.
