= Aegomorphus pinima =

Scientific classification
- Kingdom: Animalia
- Phylum: Arthropoda
- Class: Insecta
- Order: Coleoptera
- Suborder: Polyphaga
- Infraorder: Cucujiformia
- Family: Cerambycidae
- Tribe: Acanthoderini
- Genus: Aegomorphus
- Species: A. pinima

Binomial name
- Aegomorphus pinima (Galileo & Martins, 2006)

Synonyms
- Psapharochrus pinima Galileo & Martins, 2006

Species of beetle

Aegomorphus pinima is a species of beetle in the family Cerambycidae. It was described by Galileo and Martins in 2006.
