= Aegomorphus contaminatus =

Scientific classification
- Kingdom: Animalia
- Phylum: Arthropoda
- Class: Insecta
- Order: Coleoptera
- Suborder: Polyphaga
- Infraorder: Cucujiformia
- Family: Cerambycidae
- Tribe: Acanthoderini
- Genus: Aegomorphus
- Species: A. contaminatus

Binomial name
- Aegomorphus contaminatus (Thomson, 1865)

Synonyms
- Psapharochrus contaminatus Thomson, 1865; Acanthoderes contaminatus (Thomson, 1865)

Species of beetle

Aegomorphus contaminatus is a species of beetle in the family Cerambycidae. It was described by Thomson in 1865.
