= Aegomorphus inquinatus =

Scientific classification
- Kingdom: Animalia
- Phylum: Arthropoda
- Class: Insecta
- Order: Coleoptera
- Suborder: Polyphaga
- Infraorder: Cucujiformia
- Family: Cerambycidae
- Tribe: Acanthoderini
- Genus: Aegomorphus
- Species: A. inquinatus

Binomial name
- Aegomorphus inquinatus (Bates, 1872)

Synonyms
- Acanthoderes inquinatus Bates, 1872; Psapharochrus inquinatus (Bates, 1872)

Species of beetle

Aegomorphus inquinatus is a species of beetle in the family Cerambycidae. It was described by Henry Walter Bates in 1872.
