= Aegomorphus albosignus =

Scientific classification
- Kingdom: Animalia
- Phylum: Arthropoda
- Clade: Pancrustacea
- Class: Insecta
- Order: Coleoptera
- Suborder: Polyphaga
- Infraorder: Cucujiformia
- Family: Cerambycidae
- Genus: Aegomorphus
- Species: A. albosignus

Binomial name
- Aegomorphus albosignus Chemsak & Noguera, 1993

Species of beetle

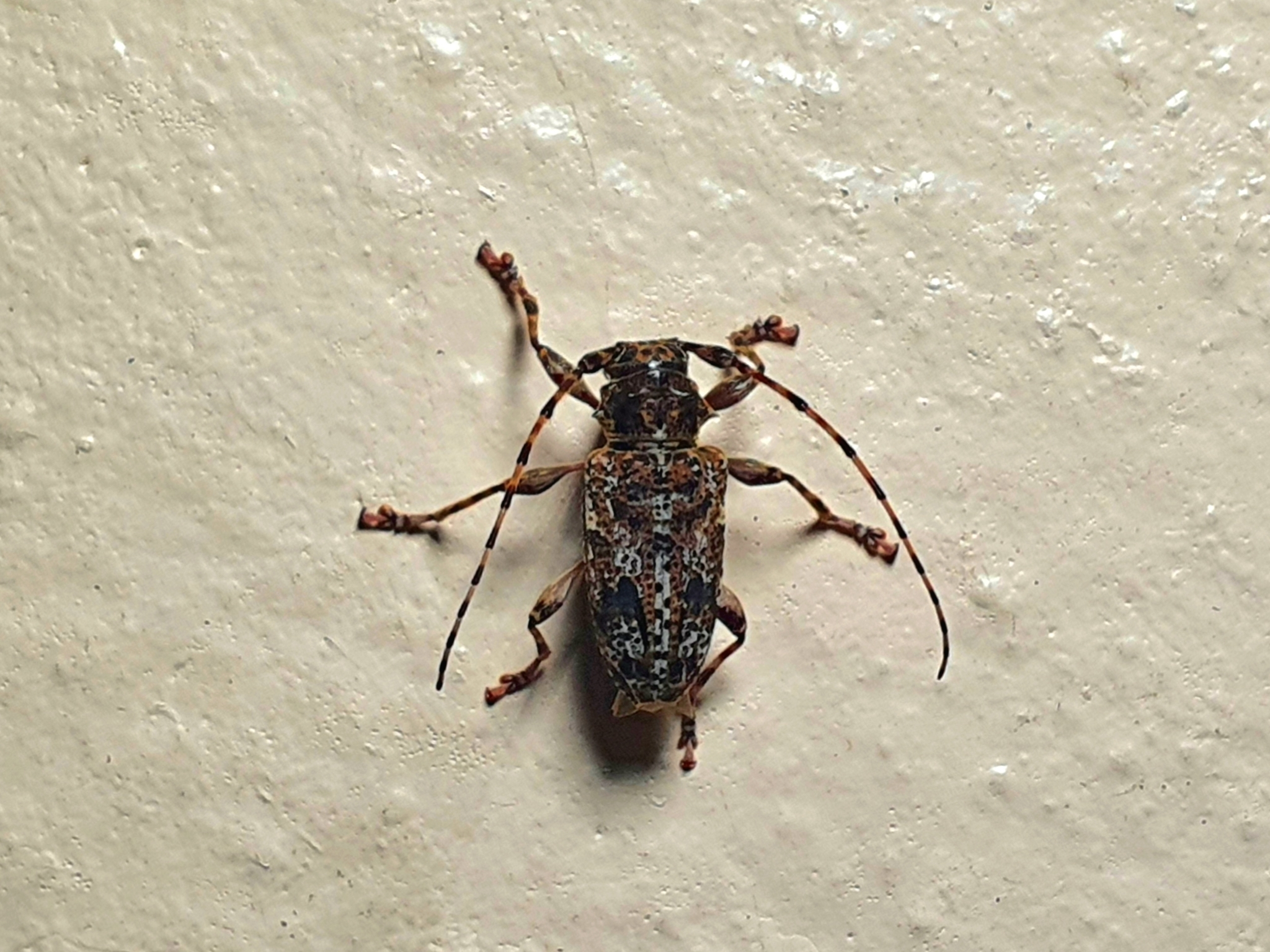
Aegomorphus albosignus in Mexico

Aegomorphus albosignus is a species of beetle in the family Cerambycidae. It was described by Chemsak and Noguera in 1993.
