= Aegomorphus mourei =

Scientific classification
- Kingdom: Animalia
- Phylum: Arthropoda
- Class: Insecta
- Order: Coleoptera
- Suborder: Polyphaga
- Infraorder: Cucujiformia
- Family: Cerambycidae
- Tribe: Acanthoderini
- Genus: Aegomorphus
- Species: A. mourei

Binomial name
- Aegomorphus mourei (Zajciw, 1964)

Synonyms
- Acanthoderes mourei Zajciw, 1964; Psapharochrus mourei (Zajciw, 1964)

Species of beetle

Aegomorphus mourei is a species of beetle in the family Cerambycidae. It was described by Zajciw in 1964.
