= Aegomorphus rufitarsis =

Scientific classification
- Kingdom: Animalia
- Phylum: Arthropoda
- Class: Insecta
- Order: Coleoptera
- Suborder: Polyphaga
- Infraorder: Cucujiformia
- Family: Cerambycidae
- Tribe: Acanthoderini
- Genus: Aegomorphus
- Species: A. rufitarsis

Binomial name
- Aegomorphus rufitarsis (Kirsch, 1889)

Synonyms
- Acanthoderes rufitarsis Kirsch, 1889; Psapharochrus rufitarsis (Kirsch, 1889)

Species of beetle

Aegomorphus rufitarsis is a species of beetle in the family Cerambycidae. It was described by Theodor Franz Wilhelm Kirsch in 1889.
