= Aegomorphus gigas =

Scientific classification
- Kingdom: Animalia
- Phylum: Arthropoda
- Class: Insecta
- Order: Coleoptera
- Suborder: Polyphaga
- Infraorder: Cucujiformia
- Family: Cerambycidae
- Tribe: Acanthoderini
- Genus: Aegomorphus
- Species: A. gigas

Binomial name
- Aegomorphus gigas (Galileo & Martins, 2012)

Synonyms
- Psapharochrus gigas Galileo & Martins, 2012

Species of beetle

Aegomorphus gigas is a species of beetle in the family Cerambycidae. It was described by Galileo and Martins in 2012.
