= Aegomorphus schmithi =

Scientific classification
- Kingdom: Animalia
- Phylum: Arthropoda
- Class: Insecta
- Order: Coleoptera
- Suborder: Polyphaga
- Infraorder: Cucujiformia
- Family: Cerambycidae
- Tribe: Acanthoderini
- Genus: Aegomorphus
- Species: A. schmithi

Binomial name
- Aegomorphus schmithi (Melzer, 1935)

Synonyms
- Acanthoderes Schmithi Melzer, 1935; Acanthoderes sexmaculatus Fuchs, 1961; Psapharochrus schmithi (Melzer, 1935)

Species of beetle

Aegomorphus schmithi is a species of beetle in the family Cerambycidae. It was described by Melzer in 1935.
