= Aegomorphus atrosignatus =

Scientific classification
- Kingdom: Animalia
- Phylum: Arthropoda
- Class: Insecta
- Order: Coleoptera
- Suborder: Polyphaga
- Infraorder: Cucujiformia
- Family: Cerambycidae
- Tribe: Acanthoderini
- Genus: Aegomorphus
- Species: A. atrosignatus

Binomial name
- Aegomorphus atrosignatus (Melzer, 1932)

Synonyms
- Acanthoderes atrosignatus Melzer, 1932; Psapharochrus atrosignatus (Melzer, 1932)

Species of beetle

Aegomorphus atrosignatus is a species of beetle in the family Cerambycidae. It was described by Melzer in 1932.
