= Aegomorphus nearnsi =

Scientific classification
- Kingdom: Animalia
- Phylum: Arthropoda
- Class: Insecta
- Order: Coleoptera
- Suborder: Polyphaga
- Infraorder: Cucujiformia
- Family: Cerambycidae
- Tribe: Acanthoderini
- Genus: Aegomorphus
- Species: A. nearnsi

Binomial name
- Aegomorphus nearnsi (Martins & Galileo, 2010)

Synonyms
- Psapharochrus nearnsi Martins & Galileo, 2010

Species of beetle

Aegomorphus nearnsi is a species of beetle in the family Cerambycidae. It was described by Martins and Galileo in 2010.
