= Aegomorphus piraiuba =

Scientific classification
- Kingdom: Animalia
- Phylum: Arthropoda
- Class: Insecta
- Order: Coleoptera
- Suborder: Polyphaga
- Infraorder: Cucujiformia
- Family: Cerambycidae
- Tribe: Acanthoderini
- Genus: Aegomorphus
- Species: A. piraiuba

Binomial name
- Aegomorphus piraiuba (Martins & Galileo, 2004)

Synonyms
- Psapharochrus piraiuba Martins & Galileo, 2004

Species of beetle

Aegomorphus piraiuba is a species of beetle in the family Cerambycidae. It was described by Martins and Galileo in 2004.
