= Aegomorphus bicuspis =

Scientific classification
- Kingdom: Animalia
- Phylum: Arthropoda
- Class: Insecta
- Order: Coleoptera
- Suborder: Polyphaga
- Infraorder: Cucujiformia
- Family: Cerambycidae
- Tribe: Acanthoderini
- Genus: Aegomorphus
- Species: A. bicuspis

Binomial name
- Aegomorphus bicuspis (Germar, 1823)

Synonyms
- Lamia bicuspis Germar, 1823; Acanthoderes bicuspis (Germar, 1823); Psapharochrus bicuspis (Germar, 1823)

Species of beetle

Aegomorphus bicuspis is a species of beetle in the family Cerambycidae. It was described by Germar in 1823.
