= Aegomorphus bivitta =

Scientific classification
- Kingdom: Animalia
- Phylum: Arthropoda
- Class: Insecta
- Order: Coleoptera
- Suborder: Polyphaga
- Infraorder: Cucujiformia
- Family: Cerambycidae
- Tribe: Acanthoderini
- Genus: Aegomorphus
- Species: A. bivitta

Binomial name
- Aegomorphus bivitta (White, 1855)

Synonyms
- Steirastoma bivitta White, 1855; Acanthoderes bivitta (White, 1855); Psapharochrus Fuliginosus Thomson, 1865; Acanthoderes bivittata Chemsak, Linsley & Noguera, 1992 (misspelling); Acanthoderes vivittata Terrón, 1997 (misspelling); Acanthoderes bivittis Tavakilian et al., 1997 (misspelling); Psapharochrus bivittus Monné & Hovore, 2006 (misspelling)

Species of beetle

Aegomorphus bivitta is a species of beetle in the family Cerambycidae. It was described by White in 1855.
