= Aegomorphus arietis =

Scientific classification
- Kingdom: Animalia
- Phylum: Arthropoda
- Class: Insecta
- Order: Coleoptera
- Suborder: Polyphaga
- Infraorder: Cucujiformia
- Family: Cerambycidae
- Tribe: Acanthoderini
- Genus: Aegomorphus
- Species: A. arietis

Binomial name
- Aegomorphus arietis (Bates, 1885)

Synonyms
- Acanthoderes arietis Bates, 1885; Psapharochrus arietis (Bates, 1885)

Species of beetle

Aegomorphus arietis is a species of beetle in the family Cerambycidae. It was described by Henry Walter Bates in 1885.
