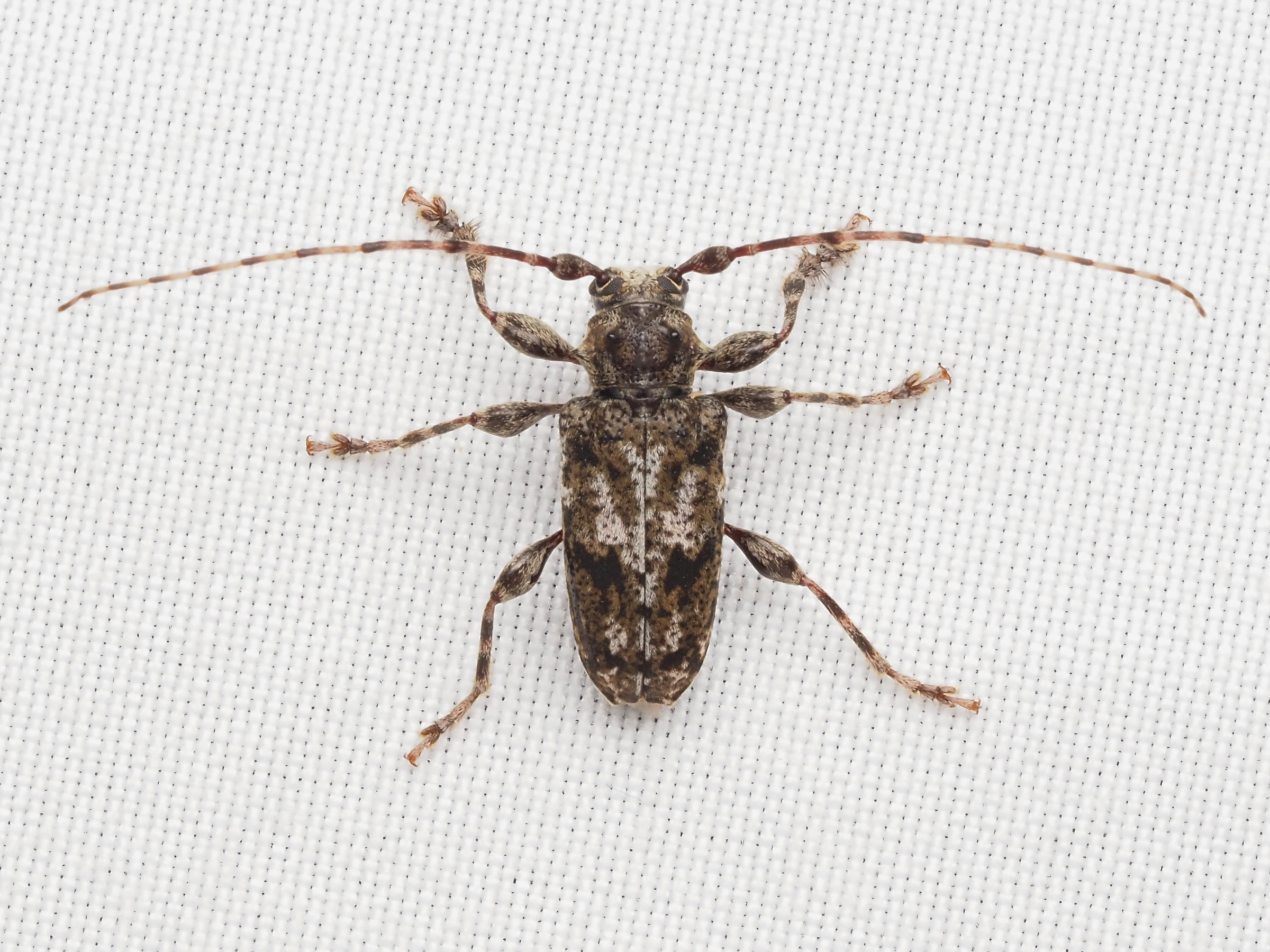

Scientific classification
- Kingdom: Animalia
- Phylum: Arthropoda
- Class: Insecta
- Order: Coleoptera
- Suborder: Polyphaga
- Infraorder: Cucujiformia
- Family: Cerambycidae
- Genus: Aegomorphus
- Species: A. modestus

Binomial name
- Aegomorphus modestus (Gyllenhal in Schoenherr, 1817)

Synonyms
- Aegomorphus decipiens Haldeman, 1847

= Aegomorphus modestus =

Species of beetle

Aegomorphus modestus is a species of beetle in the family Cerambycidae. It was described by Gyllenhal in 1817.
