= Aegomorphus lotor =

Scientific classification
- Kingdom: Animalia
- Phylum: Arthropoda
- Class: Insecta
- Order: Coleoptera
- Suborder: Polyphaga
- Infraorder: Cucujiformia
- Family: Cerambycidae
- Tribe: Acanthoderini
- Genus: Aegomorphus
- Species: A. lotor

Binomial name
- Aegomorphus lotor (White, 1855)

Synonyms
- Acanthoderes lotor White, 1855; Psapharochrus lotor (White, 1855)

Species of beetle

Aegomorphus lotor is a species of beetle in the family Cerambycidae. It was described by White in 1855.
