= Aegomorphus bimaculatus =

Scientific classification
- Kingdom: Animalia
- Phylum: Arthropoda
- Class: Insecta
- Order: Coleoptera
- Suborder: Polyphaga
- Infraorder: Cucujiformia
- Family: Cerambycidae
- Tribe: Acanthoderini
- Genus: Aegomorphus
- Species: A. bimaculatus

Binomial name
- Aegomorphus bimaculatus (Fuchs, 1958)

Synonyms
- Acanthoderes bimaculata Fuchs, 1958; Psapharochrus bimaculatus (Fuchs, 1958)

Species of beetle

Aegomorphus bimaculatus is a species of beetle in the family Cerambycidae. It was described by Ernst Fuchs in 1958.
