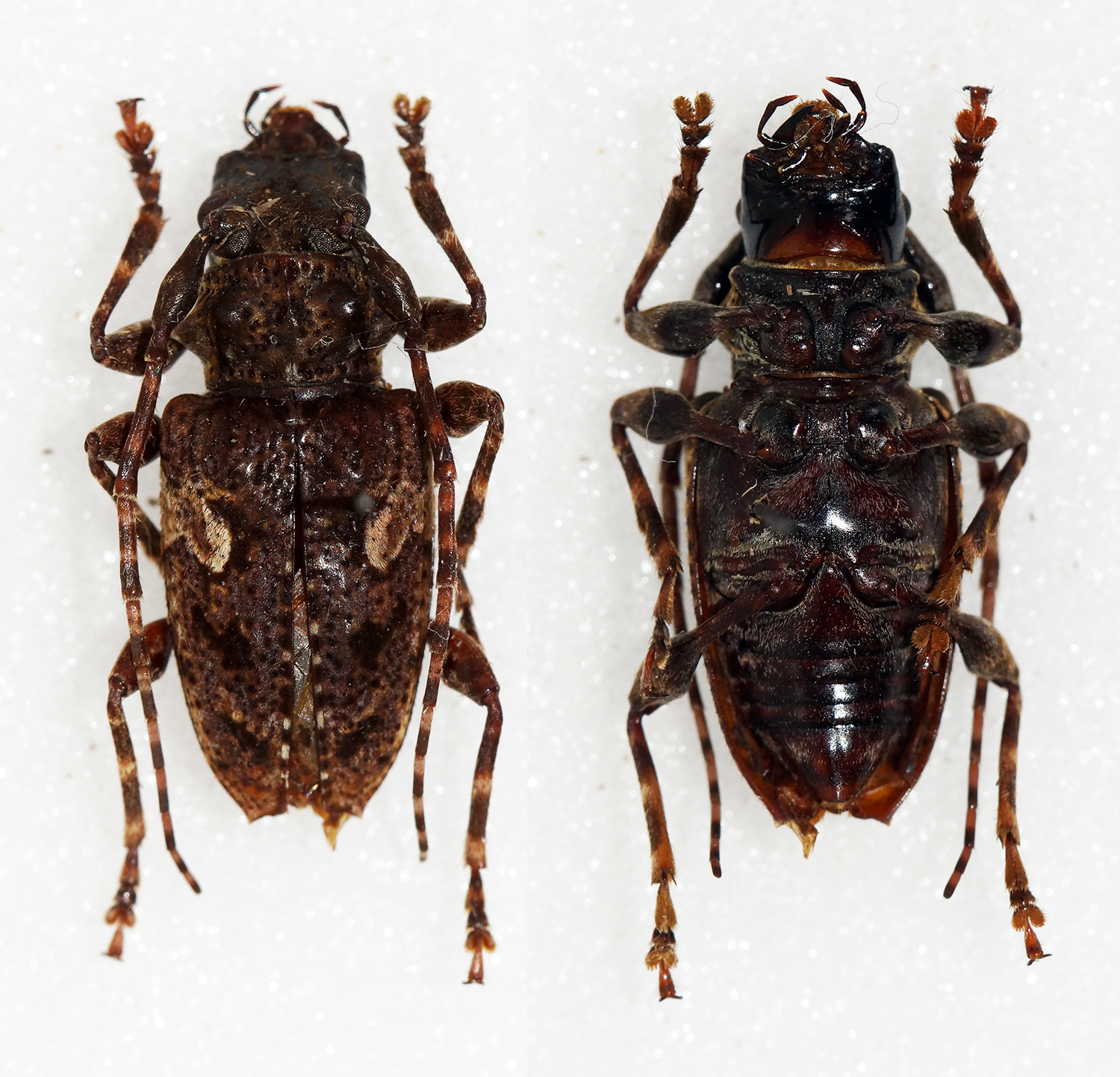

Scientific classification
- Kingdom: Animalia
- Phylum: Arthropoda
- Class: Insecta
- Order: Coleoptera
- Suborder: Polyphaga
- Infraorder: Cucujiformia
- Family: Cerambycidae
- Genus: Aegomorphus
- Species: A. circumflexus

Binomial name
- Aegomorphus circumflexus (Jacquelin du Val, 1857)

Synonyms
- Acanthocinus rusticus Klug, 1829 (Nomen oblitum); Acanthoderus circumflexus Jacquelin du Val, 1857; Acanthoderus meteoricus Gistel, 1857; Acanthoderes circumflexa (Jacquelin du Val, 1857); Psapharochrus histrio Casey, 1913; Psapharochrus guatemalensis Casey, 1913; Psapharochrus circumflexus (Jacquelin du Val, 1857)

= Aegomorphus circumflexus =

Species of beetle

Aegomorphus circumflexus is a species of beetle in the family Cerambycidae. It was described by Jacquelin du Val in 1857.
