= Aegomorphus piperatus =

Scientific classification
- Kingdom: Animalia
- Phylum: Arthropoda
- Class: Insecta
- Order: Coleoptera
- Suborder: Polyphaga
- Infraorder: Cucujiformia
- Family: Cerambycidae
- Tribe: Acanthoderini
- Genus: Aegomorphus
- Species: A. piperatus

Binomial name
- Aegomorphus piperatus (Gahan, 1892)

Synonyms
- Acanthoderes piperatus Gahan, 1892; Psapharochrus piperatus (Gahan, 1892)

Species of beetle

Aegomorphus piperatus is a species of beetle in the family Cerambycidae. It was described by Gahan in 1892.
