= Aegomorphus conifera =

Scientific classification
- Kingdom: Animalia
- Phylum: Arthropoda
- Class: Insecta
- Order: Coleoptera
- Suborder: Polyphaga
- Infraorder: Cucujiformia
- Family: Cerambycidae
- Tribe: Acanthoderini
- Genus: Aegomorphus
- Species: A. conifera

Binomial name
- Aegomorphus conifera (Zajciw, 1963)

Synonyms
- Acanthoderes conifera Zajciw, 1963; Psapharochrus coniferus Monné & Monné, 2016 (misspelling)

Species of beetle

Aegomorphus conifera is a species of beetle in the family Cerambycidae. It was described by Zajciw in 1963.
