= Aegomorphus clericus =

Scientific classification
- Kingdom: Animalia
- Phylum: Arthropoda
- Class: Insecta
- Order: Coleoptera
- Suborder: Polyphaga
- Infraorder: Cucujiformia
- Family: Cerambycidae
- Tribe: Acanthoderini
- Genus: Aegomorphus
- Species: A. clericus

Binomial name
- Aegomorphus clericus (Bates, 1880)

Synonyms
- Acanthoderes clericus Bates, 1880; Psapharochrus clericus (Bates, 1880)

Species of beetle

Aegomorphus clericus is a species of beetle in the family Cerambycidae. It was described by Henry Walter Bates in 1880.
