= Aegomorphus carinicollis =

Scientific classification
- Kingdom: Animalia
- Phylum: Arthropoda
- Class: Insecta
- Order: Coleoptera
- Suborder: Polyphaga
- Infraorder: Cucujiformia
- Family: Cerambycidae
- Tribe: Acanthoderini
- Genus: Aegomorphus
- Species: A. carinicollis

Binomial name
- Aegomorphus carinicollis (Bates, 1880)

Synonyms
- Acanthoderes carinicollis Bates, 1880; Psapharochrus carinicollis (Bates, 1880)

Species of beetle

Aegomorphus carinicollis is a species of beetle in the family Cerambycidae. It was described by Henry Walter Bates in 1880.
