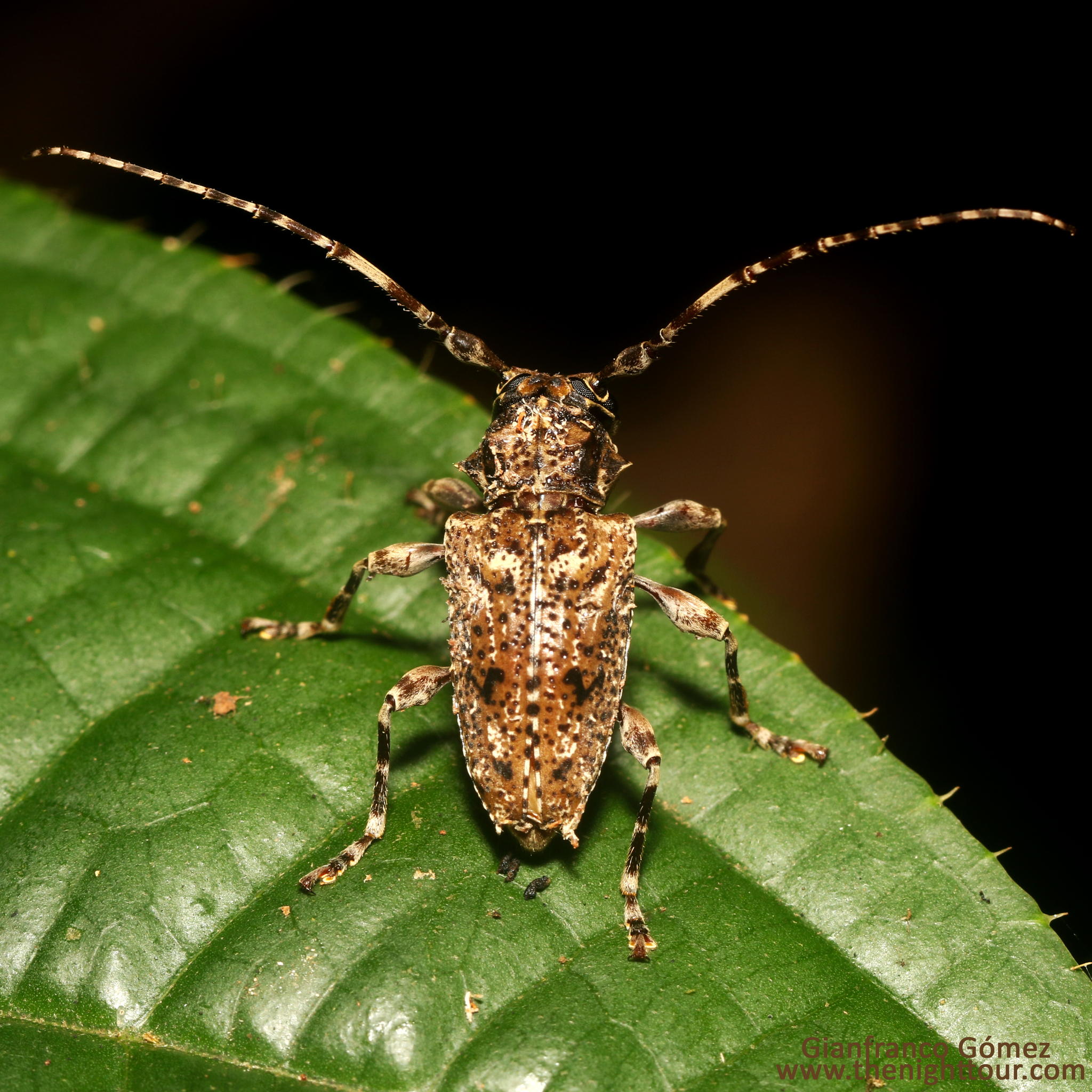

Scientific classification
- Kingdom: Animalia
- Phylum: Arthropoda
- Class: Insecta
- Order: Coleoptera
- Suborder: Polyphaga
- Infraorder: Cucujiformia
- Family: Cerambycidae
- Tribe: Acanthoderini
- Genus: Aegomorphus
- Species: A. polystictus

Binomial name
- Aegomorphus polystictus (Bates, 1885)

Synonyms
- Acanthoderes polystictus Bates, 1885; Psapharochrus polystictus (Bates, 1885)

= Aegomorphus polystictus =

Species of beetle

Aegomorphus polystictus is a species of beetle in the family Cerambycidae. It was described by Henry Walter Bates in 1885.
