= Aegomorphus flavitarsis =

Scientific classification
- Kingdom: Animalia
- Phylum: Arthropoda
- Class: Insecta
- Order: Coleoptera
- Suborder: Polyphaga
- Infraorder: Cucujiformia
- Family: Cerambycidae
- Tribe: Acanthoderini
- Genus: Aegomorphus
- Species: A. flavitarsis

Binomial name
- Aegomorphus flavitarsis (Fuchs, 1962)

Synonyms
- Acanthoderes flavitarsis Fuchs, 1962; Psapharochrus flavitarsis (Fuchs, 1962)

Species of beetle

Aegomorphus flavitarsis is a species of beetle in the family Cerambycidae. It was described by Ernst Fuchs in 1962.
