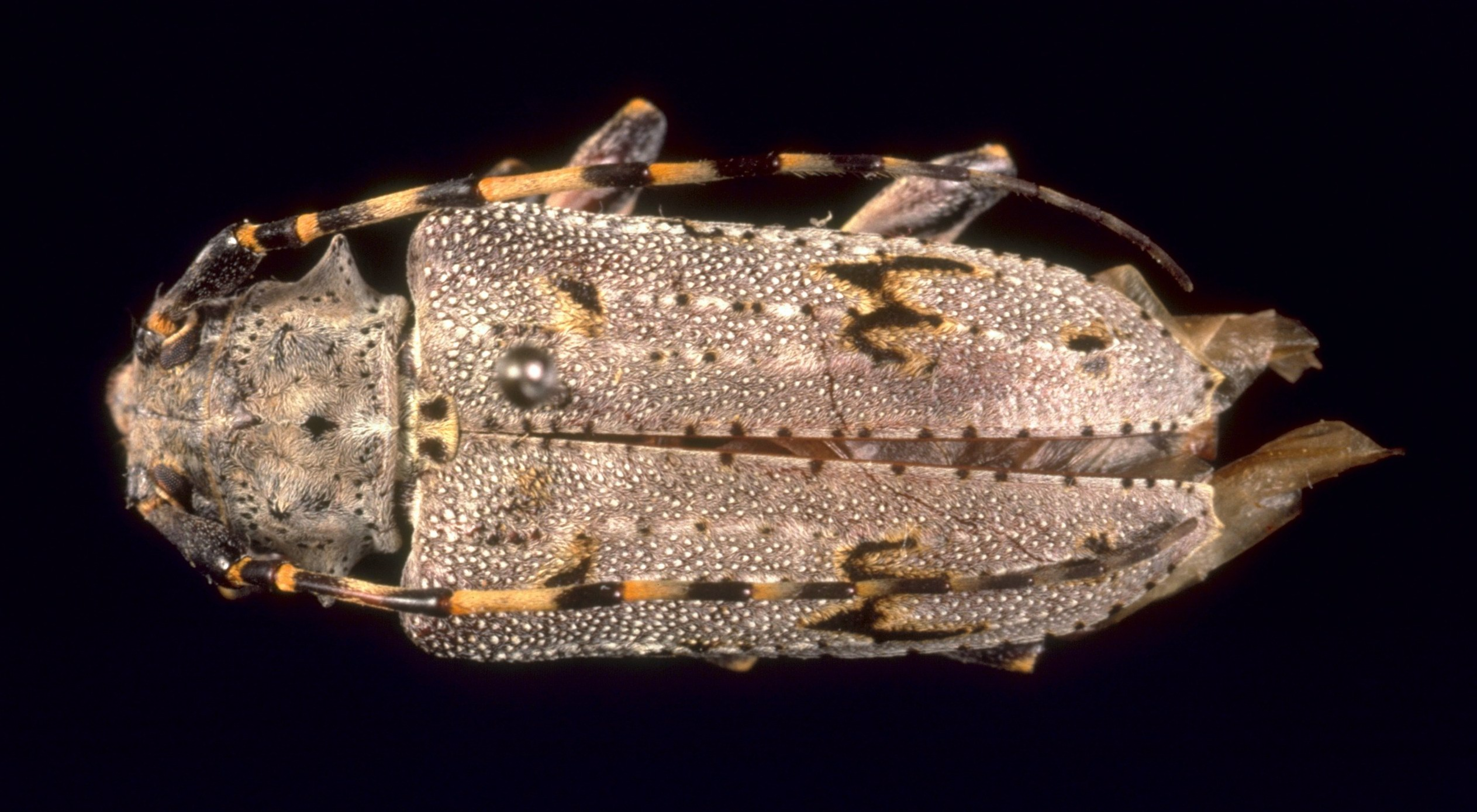

Scientific classification
- Kingdom: Animalia
- Phylum: Arthropoda
- Class: Insecta
- Order: Coleoptera
- Suborder: Polyphaga
- Infraorder: Cucujiformia
- Family: Cerambycidae
- Genus: Aegomorphus
- Species: A. morrisi

Binomial name
- Aegomorphus morrisi (Uhler, 1855)

Synonyms
- Acanthoderes Morrisi Uhler, 1855; Aethiopoctines leucogenus Thomson, 1868; Aegomorphus morrisii Auctt. (misspelling)

= Aegomorphus morrisi =

Species of beetle

Aegomorphus morrisi is a species of beetle in the family Cerambycidae. It was described by Uhler in 1855. The species name is often misspelled as morrisii (e.g.) but this spelling is not in prevailing usage and the original spelling (as morrisi) is therefore valid under ICZN Article 33.4.
