= Aegomorphus lateralis =

Scientific classification
- Kingdom: Animalia
- Phylum: Arthropoda
- Class: Insecta
- Order: Coleoptera
- Suborder: Polyphaga
- Infraorder: Cucujiformia
- Family: Cerambycidae
- Tribe: Acanthoderini
- Genus: Aegomorphus
- Species: A. lateralis

Binomial name
- Aegomorphus lateralis (Bates, 1861)

Synonyms
- Acanthoderes lateralis Bates, 1861; Acanthoderes armata Melzer, 1935; Psapharochrus lateralis (Bates, 1861)

Species of beetle

Aegomorphus lateralis is a species of beetle in the family Cerambycidae. It was described by Henry Walter Bates in 1861.
