= Aegomorphus signatus =

Scientific classification
- Kingdom: Animalia
- Phylum: Arthropoda
- Class: Insecta
- Order: Coleoptera
- Suborder: Polyphaga
- Infraorder: Cucujiformia
- Family: Cerambycidae
- Tribe: Acanthoderini
- Genus: Aegomorphus
- Species: A. signatus

Binomial name
- Aegomorphus signatus (Gahan, 1892)

Synonyms
- Acanthoderes signatus Gahan, 1892; Psapharochrus signatus (Gahan, 1892)

Species of beetle

Aegomorphus signatus is a species of beetle in the family Cerambycidae. It was described by Gahan in 1892.
