= Aegomorphus arizonicus =

Scientific classification
- Kingdom: Animalia
- Phylum: Arthropoda
- Class: Insecta
- Order: Coleoptera
- Suborder: Polyphaga
- Infraorder: Cucujiformia
- Family: Cerambycidae
- Genus: Aegomorphus
- Species: A. arizonicus

Binomial name
- Aegomorphus arizonicus Linsley & Chemsak, 1984

Species of beetle

Aegomorphus arizonicus is a species of beetle in the family Cerambycidae. It was described by Linsley and Chemsak in 1984.
