= Aegomorphus socorroensis =

Scientific classification
- Kingdom: Animalia
- Phylum: Arthropoda
- Class: Insecta
- Order: Coleoptera
- Suborder: Polyphaga
- Infraorder: Cucujiformia
- Family: Cerambycidae
- Tribe: Acanthoderini
- Genus: Aegomorphus
- Species: A. socorroensis

Binomial name
- Aegomorphus socorroensis (Linsley, 1942)

Synonyms
- Acanthoderes socorroensis Linsley, 1942; Psapharochrus socorroensis (Linsley, 1942)

Species of beetle

Aegomorphus socorroensis is a species of beetle in the family Cerambycidae. It was described by Linsley in 1942.
