= Aegomorphus nigrovittatus =

Scientific classification
- Kingdom: Animalia
- Phylum: Arthropoda
- Class: Insecta
- Order: Coleoptera
- Suborder: Polyphaga
- Infraorder: Cucujiformia
- Family: Cerambycidae
- Tribe: Acanthoderini
- Genus: Aegomorphus
- Species: A. nigrovittatus

Binomial name
- Aegomorphus nigrovittatus (Zajciw, 1969)

Synonyms
- Acanthoderes nigrovittata Zajciw, 1969; Psapharochrus nigrovittatus (Zajciw, 1969)

Species of beetle

Aegomorphus nigrovittatus is a species of beetle in the family Cerambycidae. It was described by Zajciw in 1969.
