= Aegomorphus galapagoensis =

Scientific classification
- Kingdom: Animalia
- Phylum: Arthropoda
- Class: Insecta
- Order: Coleoptera
- Suborder: Polyphaga
- Infraorder: Cucujiformia
- Family: Cerambycidae
- Tribe: Acanthoderini
- Genus: Aegomorphus
- Species: A. galapagoensis

Binomial name
- Aegomorphus galapagoensis (Linell, 1899)

Synonyms
- Acanthoderes galapagoensis Linell, 1899; Acanthoderes galapagonesis [sic] var. vonhageni Mutchler, 1938; Acanthoderes galapagoensis williamsi Linsley & Chemsak, 1966; Psapharochrus galapagoensis (Linell, 1899)

Species of beetle

Aegomorphus galapagoensis is a species of beetle in the family Cerambycidae. It was described by Linell in 1899.
