= Acakyra ocellata =

Scientific classification
- Domain: Eukaryota
- Kingdom: Animalia
- Phylum: Arthropoda
- Class: Insecta
- Order: Coleoptera
- Suborder: Polyphaga
- Infraorder: Cucujiformia
- Family: Cerambycidae
- Genus: Acakyra
- Species: A. ocellata

Binomial name
- Acakyra ocellata Chemsak & Hovore, 2002

Species of beetle

Acakyra ocellata is a species of beetle in the family Cerambycidae. It was described by Chemsak and Hovore in 2002.
