= Aegomorphus homonymus =

Scientific classification
- Kingdom: Animalia
- Phylum: Arthropoda
- Class: Insecta
- Order: Coleoptera
- Suborder: Polyphaga
- Infraorder: Cucujiformia
- Family: Cerambycidae
- Tribe: Acanthoderini
- Genus: Aegomorphus
- Species: A. homonymus

Binomial name
- Aegomorphus homonymus (Blackwelder, 1946)

Synonyms
- Acanthoderes latevittata Aurivillius, 1924 (Preocc.); Acanthoderes homonymus Blackwelder, 1946; Psapharochrus homonymus (Blackwelder, 1946)

Species of beetle

Aegomorphus homonymus is a species of beetle in the family Cerambycidae. It was described by Aurivillius in 1924, and renamed by Blackwelder in 1946.
