= Aegomorphus excellens =

Scientific classification
- Kingdom: Animalia
- Phylum: Arthropoda
- Class: Insecta
- Order: Coleoptera
- Suborder: Polyphaga
- Infraorder: Cucujiformia
- Family: Cerambycidae
- Tribe: Acanthoderini
- Genus: Aegomorphus
- Species: A. excellens

Binomial name
- Aegomorphus excellens (Zajciw, 1964)

Synonyms
- Acanthoderes excellens Zajciw, 1964; Psapharochrus excellens (Zajciw, 1964)

Species of beetle

Aegomorphus excellens is a species of beetle in the family Cerambycidae. It was described by Zajciw in 1964.
