= Acakyra nigrofasciata =

Scientific classification
- Domain: Eukaryota
- Kingdom: Animalia
- Phylum: Arthropoda
- Class: Insecta
- Order: Coleoptera
- Suborder: Polyphaga
- Infraorder: Cucujiformia
- Family: Cerambycidae
- Genus: Acakyra
- Species: A. nigrofasciata

Binomial name
- Acakyra nigrofasciata Martins & Galileo, 2001

Species of beetle

Acakyra nigrofasciata is a species of beetle in the family Cerambycidae. It was described by Martins and Galileo in 2001.
