= Aegomorphus binocularis =

Scientific classification
- Kingdom: Animalia
- Phylum: Arthropoda
- Class: Insecta
- Order: Coleoptera
- Suborder: Polyphaga
- Infraorder: Cucujiformia
- Family: Cerambycidae
- Tribe: Acanthoderini
- Genus: Aegomorphus
- Species: A. binocularis

Binomial name
- Aegomorphus binocularis (Martins, 1981)

Synonyms
- Acanthoderes binocularis Martins, 1981; Psapharochrus binocularis (Martins, 1981)

Species of beetle

Aegomorphus binocularis is a species of beetle in the family Cerambycidae. It was described by Martins in 1981.
