= Aegomorphus pereirai =

Scientific classification
- Kingdom: Animalia
- Phylum: Arthropoda
- Class: Insecta
- Order: Coleoptera
- Suborder: Polyphaga
- Infraorder: Cucujiformia
- Family: Cerambycidae
- Tribe: Acanthoderini
- Genus: Aegomorphus
- Species: A. pereirai

Binomial name
- Aegomorphus pereirai (Prosen & Lane, 1955)

Synonyms
- Myoxomorpha pereirai Prosen & Lane, 1955; Acanthoderes stygialis Tippmann, 1960; Acanthoderes pereirai (Prosen & Lane, 1955); Psapharochrus pereirai (Prosen & Lane, 1955)

Species of beetle

Aegomorphus pereirai is a species of beetle in the family Cerambycidae. It was described by Prosen and Lane in 1955.
