= Aegomorphus juno =

Scientific classification
- Kingdom: Animalia
- Phylum: Arthropoda
- Class: Insecta
- Order: Coleoptera
- Suborder: Polyphaga
- Infraorder: Cucujiformia
- Family: Cerambycidae
- Tribe: Acanthoderini
- Genus: Aegomorphus
- Species: A. juno

Binomial name
- Aegomorphus juno (Fisher, 1938)

Synonyms
- Acanthoderes juno Fisher, 1938; Psapharochrus juno (Fisher, 1938)

Species of beetle

Aegomorphus juno is a species of beetle in the family Cerambycidae. It was described by Fisher in 1938.
