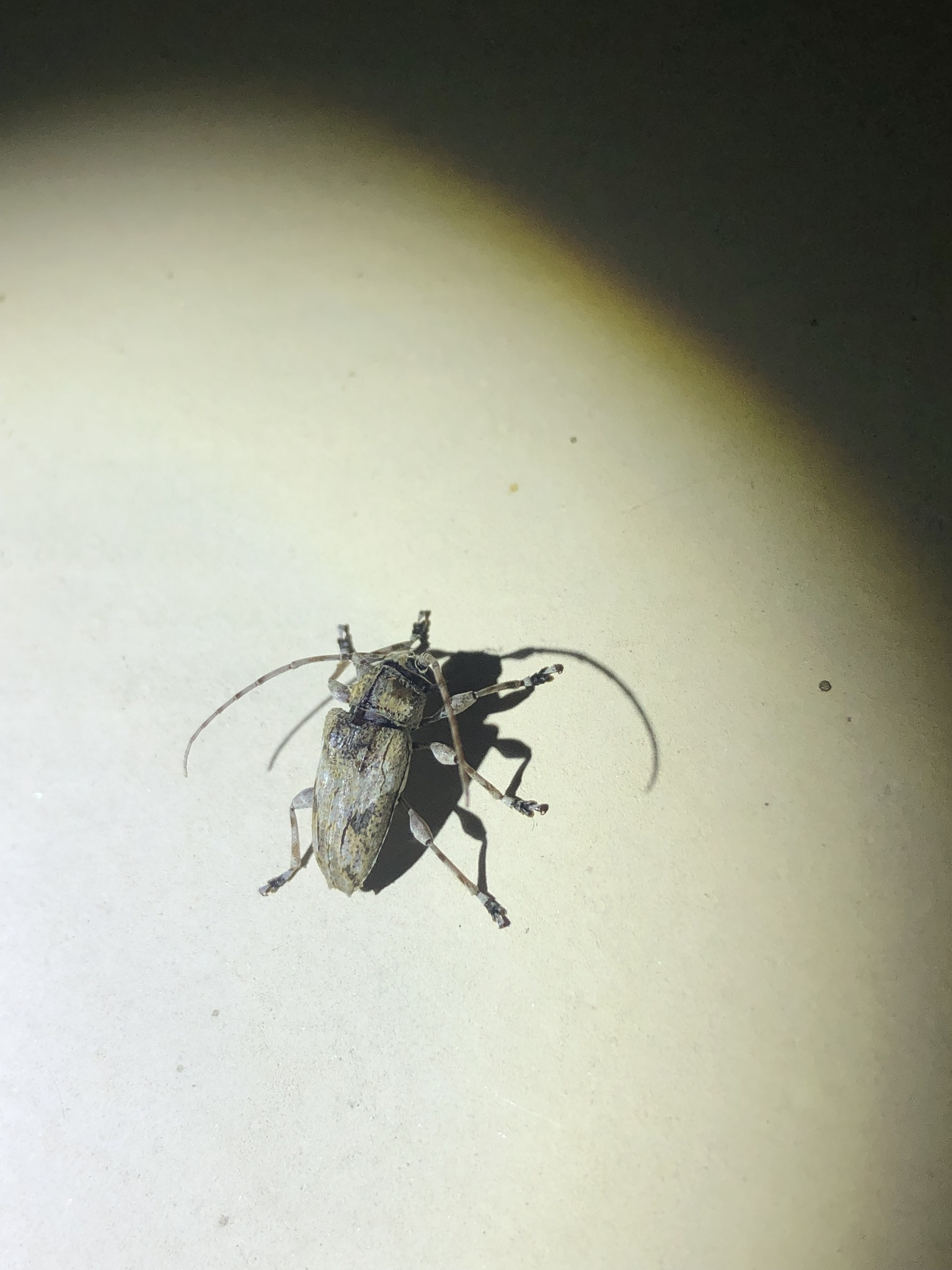

Scientific classification
- Kingdom: Animalia
- Phylum: Arthropoda
- Clade: Pancrustacea
- Class: Insecta
- Order: Coleoptera
- Suborder: Polyphaga
- Infraorder: Cucujiformia
- Family: Cerambycidae
- Tribe: Acanthoderini
- Genus: Aegomorphus
- Species: A. ridleyi

Binomial name
- Aegomorphus ridleyi (Waterhouse, 1894)

Synonyms
- Acanthoderes Ridleyi Waterhouse, 1894; Psapharochrus ridleyi (Waterhouse, 1894)

= Aegomorphus ridleyi =

Species of beetle

Aegomorphus ridleyi is a species of beetle in the family Cerambycidae. It was described by Waterhouse in 1894.
