= Aegomorphus magnus =

Scientific classification
- Kingdom: Animalia
- Phylum: Arthropoda
- Class: Insecta
- Order: Coleoptera
- Suborder: Polyphaga
- Infraorder: Cucujiformia
- Family: Cerambycidae
- Tribe: Acanthoderini
- Genus: Aegomorphus
- Species: A. magnus

Binomial name
- Aegomorphus magnus (Marinoni & Martins, 1978)

Synonyms
- Acanthoderes magnus Marinoni & Martins, 1978; Psapharochrus magnus (Marinoni & Martins, 1978)

Species of beetle

Aegomorphus magnus is a species of beetle in the family Cerambycidae. It was described by Marinoni and Martins in 1978.
