= Aegomorphus travassosi =

Scientific classification
- Kingdom: Animalia
- Phylum: Arthropoda
- Class: Insecta
- Order: Coleoptera
- Suborder: Polyphaga
- Infraorder: Cucujiformia
- Family: Cerambycidae
- Tribe: Acanthoderini
- Genus: Aegomorphus
- Species: A. travassosi

Binomial name
- Aegomorphus travassosi (Monné & Magno, 1992)

Synonyms
- Plistonax travassosi Monné & Magno, 1992

Species of beetle

Aegomorphus travassosi is a species of beetle in the family Cerambycidae. It was described by Monné & Magno in 1992.
