= Aegomorphus luctuosus =

Scientific classification
- Kingdom: Animalia
- Phylum: Arthropoda
- Class: Insecta
- Order: Coleoptera
- Suborder: Polyphaga
- Infraorder: Cucujiformia
- Family: Cerambycidae
- Tribe: Acanthoderini
- Genus: Aegomorphus
- Species: A. luctuosus

Binomial name
- Aegomorphus luctuosus (Bates, 1880)

Synonyms
- Acanthoderes luctuosus Bates, 1880; Psapharochrus luctuosus (Bates, 1880)

Species of beetle

Aegomorphus luctuosus is a species of beetle in the family Cerambycidae. It was described by Henry Walter Bates in 1880.
