= Aegomorphus maccartyi =

Scientific classification
- Kingdom: Animalia
- Phylum: Arthropoda
- Class: Insecta
- Order: Coleoptera
- Suborder: Polyphaga
- Infraorder: Cucujiformia
- Family: Cerambycidae
- Genus: Aegomorphus
- Species: A. maccartyi

Binomial name
- Aegomorphus maccartyi (Chemsak & Hovore, 2002)

Synonyms
- Acanthoderes maccartyi Chemsak & Hovore, 2002

Species of beetle

Aegomorphus maccartyi is a species of beetle in the family Cerambycidae. It was described by Chemsak and Hovore in 2002.
