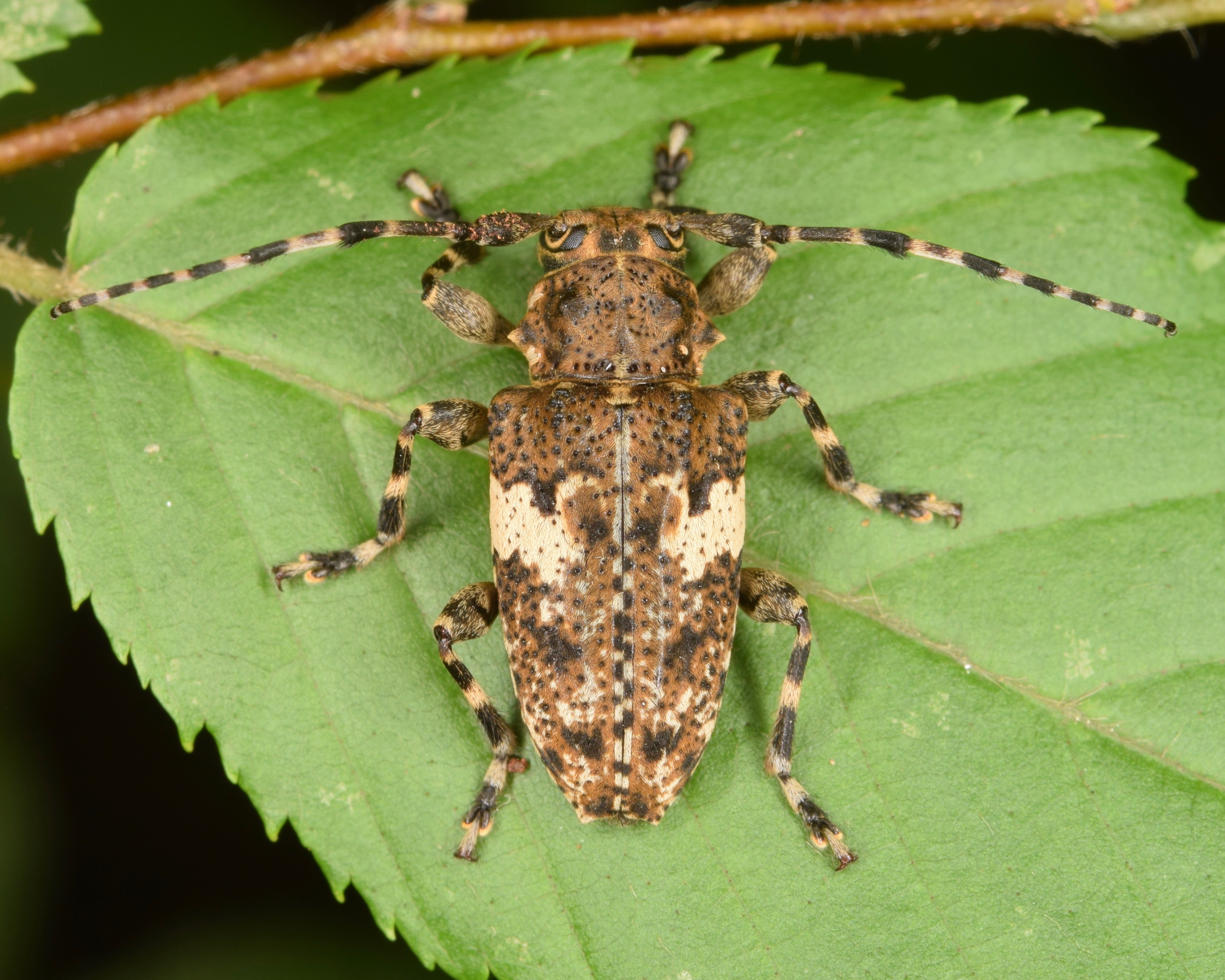

Scientific classification
- Kingdom: Animalia
- Phylum: Arthropoda
- Class: Insecta
- Order: Coleoptera
- Suborder: Polyphaga
- Infraorder: Cucujiformia
- Family: Cerambycidae
- Genus: Aegomorphus
- Species: A. quadrigibbus

Binomial name
- Aegomorphus quadrigibbus (Say, 1831)

Synonyms
- Acanthocinus quadrigibbus Say, 1831; Acanthoderes quadrigibba (Say, 1831) (misspelling); Psapharochrus quadrigibbus lucidus Knull, 1958

= Aegomorphus quadrigibbus =

Species of beetle

Aegomorphus quadrigibbus is a species of beetle in the family Cerambycidae. It was described by Thomas Say in 1831.
