= Aegomorphus nigricans =

Scientific classification
- Kingdom: Animalia
- Phylum: Arthropoda
- Class: Insecta
- Order: Coleoptera
- Suborder: Polyphaga
- Infraorder: Cucujiformia
- Family: Cerambycidae
- Tribe: Acanthoderini
- Genus: Aegomorphus
- Species: A. nigricans

Binomial name
- Aegomorphus nigricans (Lameere, 1884)

Synonyms
- Acanthoderes nigricans Lameere, 1884; Psapharochrus nigricans (Lameere, 1884)

Species of beetle

Aegomorphus nigricans is a species of beetle in the family Cerambycidae. It was described by Lameere in 1884.
