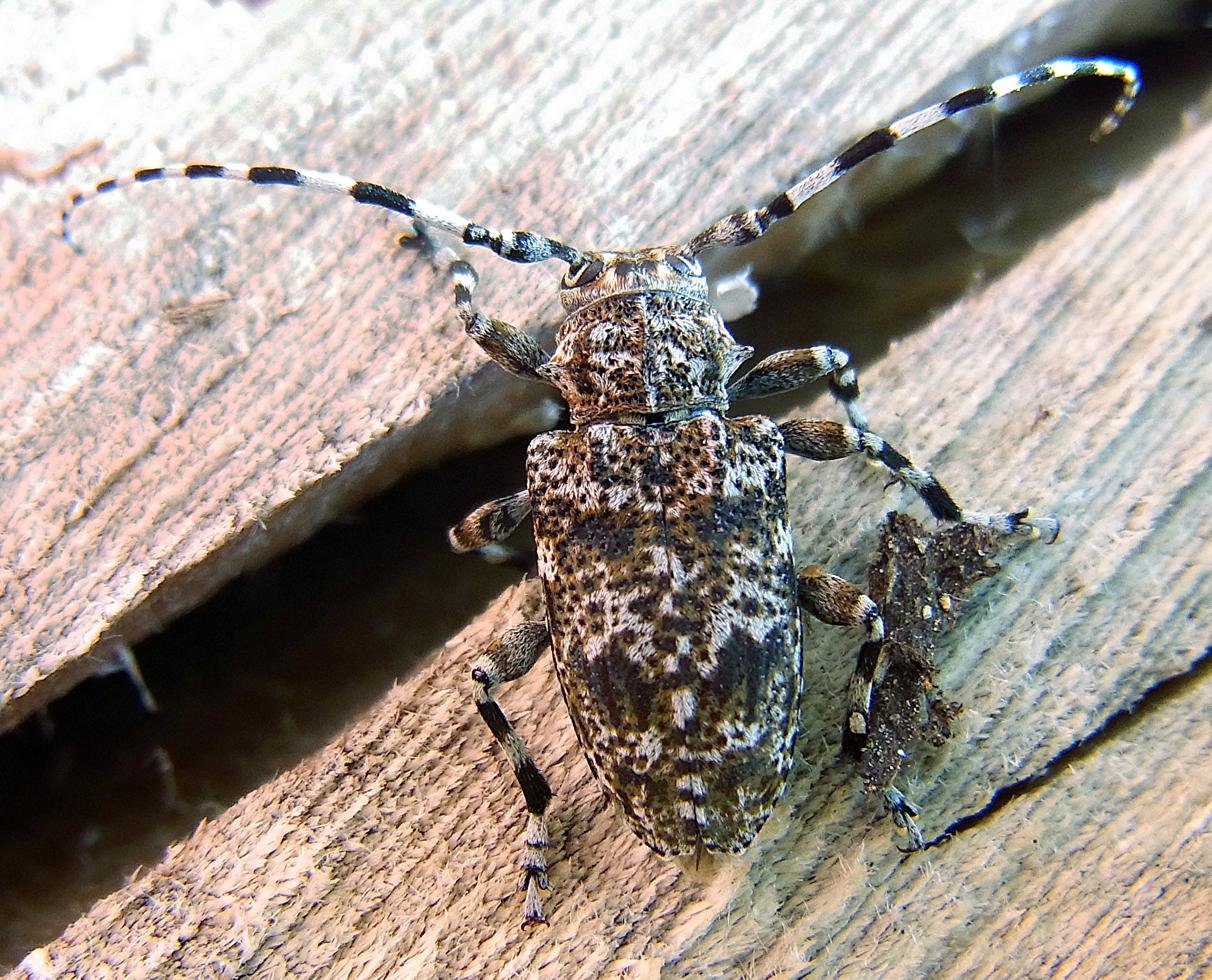

Scientific classification
- Kingdom: Animalia
- Phylum: Arthropoda
- Class: Insecta
- Order: Coleoptera
- Suborder: Polyphaga
- Infraorder: Cucujiformia
- Family: Cerambycidae
- Genus: Aegomorphus
- Species: A. clavipes

Binomial name
- Aegomorphus clavipes (Schrank, 1781)

= Aegomorphus clavipes =

Species of beetle

Aegomorphus clavipes is a species of beetle belonging to the family Cerambycidae.

It is native to Eurasia.
