= Aegomorphus purulensis =

Scientific classification
- Kingdom: Animalia
- Phylum: Arthropoda
- Clade: Pancrustacea
- Class: Insecta
- Order: Coleoptera
- Suborder: Polyphaga
- Infraorder: Cucujiformia
- Family: Cerambycidae
- Tribe: Acanthoderini
- Genus: Aegomorphus
- Species: A. purulensis

Binomial name
- Aegomorphus purulensis (Bates, 1885)

Synonyms
- Acanthoderes purulensis Bates, 1885; Psapharochrus purulensis (Bates, 1885); Acanthoderes umbratus Bates, 1885; Aegomorphus umbratus (Bates, 1885)

Species of beetle

Aegomorphus purulensis is a species of beetle in the family Cerambycidae. It was described by Henry Walter Bates in 1885. It occurs in Central America (Guatemala, Honduras, and Nicaragua).

Aegomorphus purulensis measure 10.6–14.9 mm (0.42–0.59 in) in length.
