= Acakyra crocostigma =

Scientific classification
- Kingdom: Animalia
- Phylum: Arthropoda
- Clade: Pancrustacea
- Class: Insecta
- Order: Coleoptera
- Suborder: Polyphaga
- Infraorder: Cucujiformia
- Family: Cerambycidae
- Tribe: Acanthoderini
- Genus: Acakyra
- Species: A. crocostigma

Binomial name
- Acakyra crocostigma (Bates, 1880)

Synonyms
- Acanthoderes crocostigma Bates, 1880; Aegomorphus crocostigma (Bates, 1880); Psapharochrus crocostigma (Bates, 1880)

Species of beetle

Acakyra crocostigma is a species of beetle in the family Cerambycidae. It was described by Henry Walter Bates in 1880. It is known from Ecuador.

Acakyra crocostigma measure 17 mm (0.67 in) in length.
