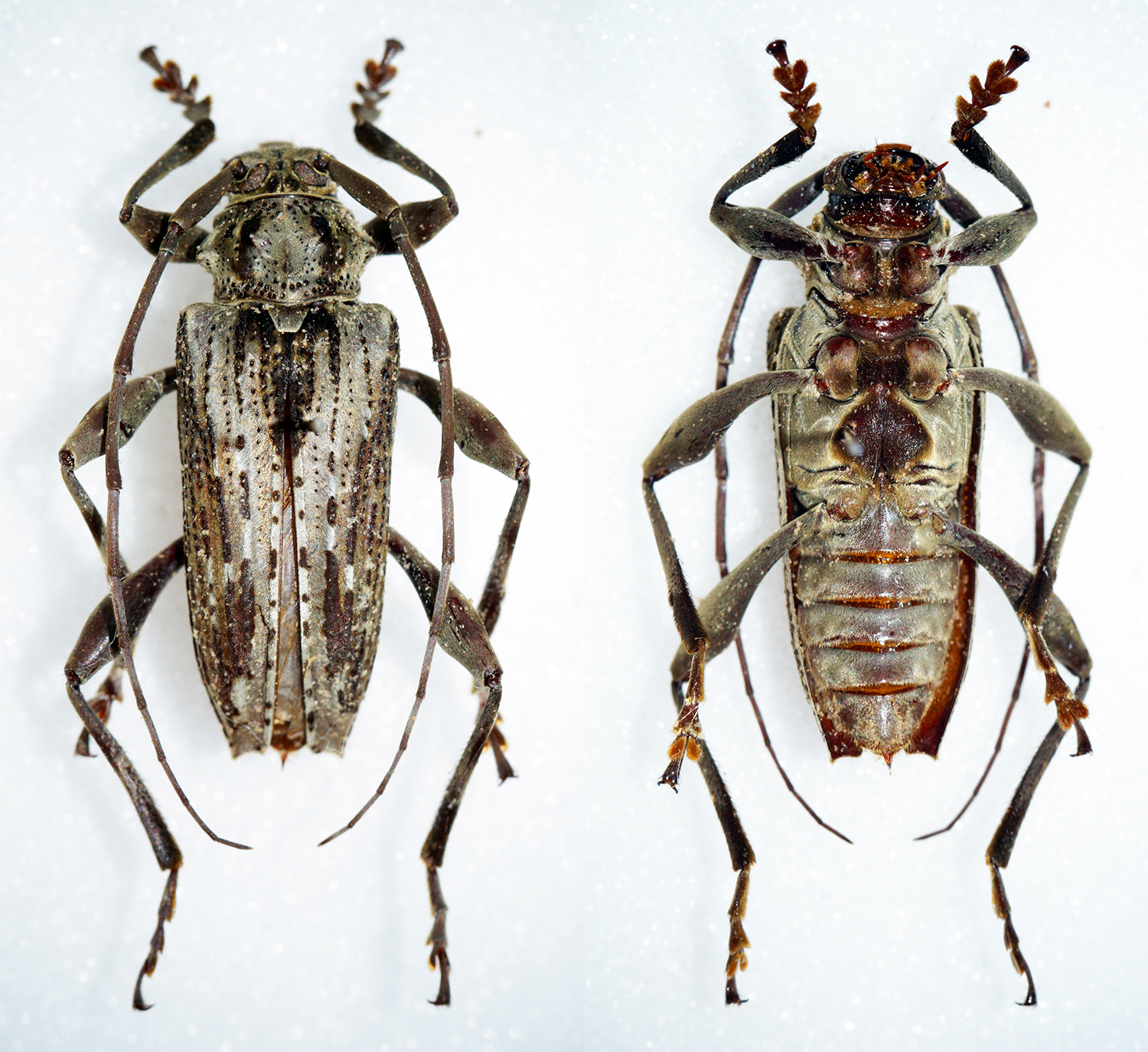

Scientific classification
- Domain: Eukaryota
- Kingdom: Animalia
- Phylum: Arthropoda
- Class: Insecta
- Order: Coleoptera
- Suborder: Polyphaga
- Infraorder: Cucujiformia
- Family: Cerambycidae
- Genus: Aegoschema
- Species: A. moniliferum

Binomial name
- Aegoschema moniliferum (White, 1855)

= Aegoschema moniliferum =

Species of beetle

Aegoschema moniliferum is a species of beetle in the family Cerambycidae. It was described by White in 1855.
