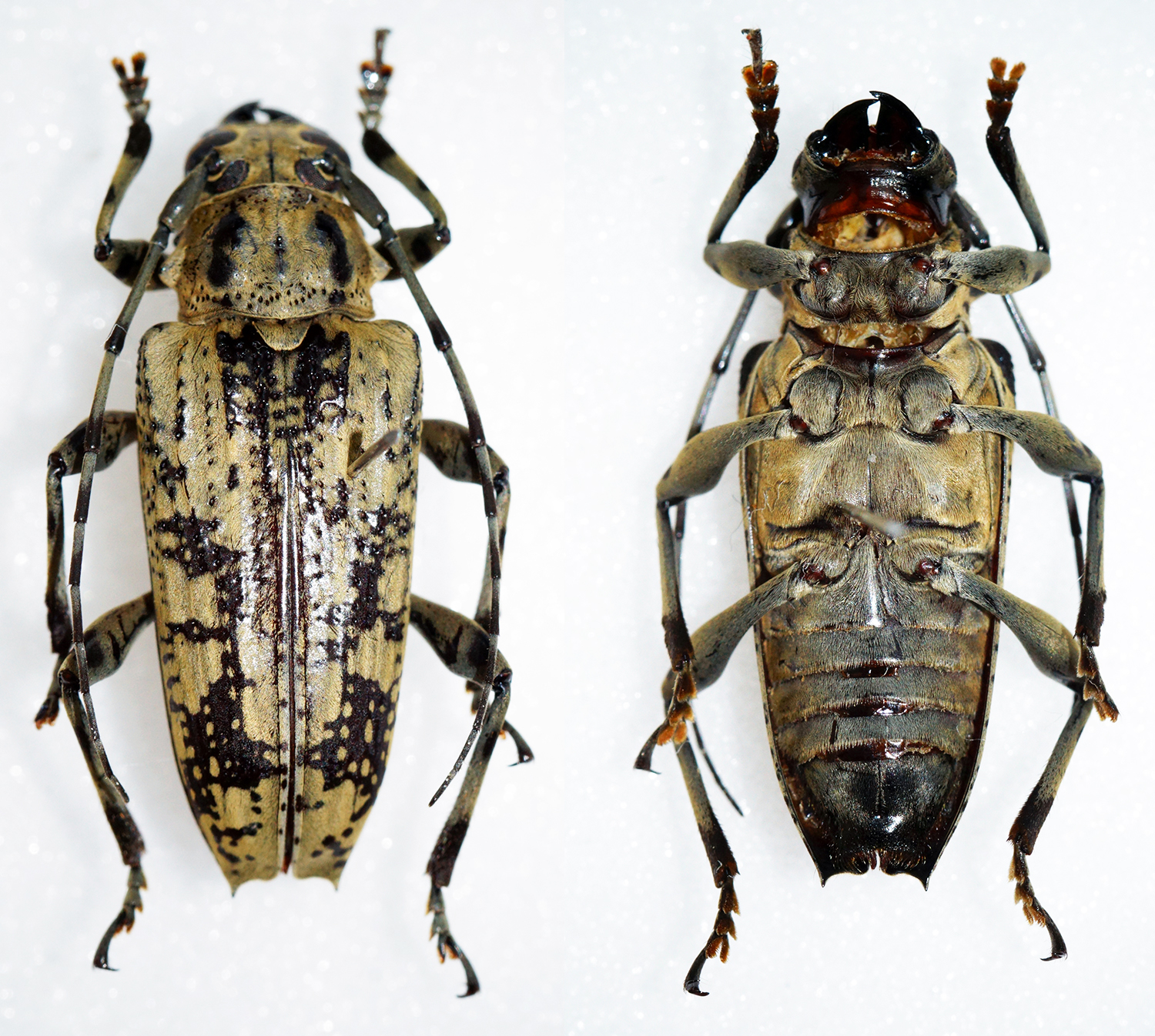

Scientific classification
- Domain: Eukaryota
- Kingdom: Animalia
- Phylum: Arthropoda
- Class: Insecta
- Order: Coleoptera
- Suborder: Polyphaga
- Infraorder: Cucujiformia
- Family: Cerambycidae
- Genus: Aegoschema
- Species: A. obesum

Binomial name
- Aegoschema obesum (Bates, 1861)

= Aegoschema obesum =

Species of beetle

Aegoschema obesum is a species of beetle in the family Cerambycidae. It was described by Henry Walter Bates in 1861.
