= Aegoschema peruvianum =

Scientific classification
- Domain: Eukaryota
- Kingdom: Animalia
- Phylum: Arthropoda
- Class: Insecta
- Order: Coleoptera
- Suborder: Polyphaga
- Infraorder: Cucujiformia
- Family: Cerambycidae
- Genus: Aegoschema
- Species: A. peruvianum

Binomial name
- Aegoschema peruvianum Lane, 1973

Species of beetle

Aegoschema peruvianum is a species of beetle in the family Cerambycidae. It was described by Lane in 1973.
