= Aegoschema migueli =

Scientific classification
- Domain: Eukaryota
- Kingdom: Animalia
- Phylum: Arthropoda
- Class: Insecta
- Order: Coleoptera
- Suborder: Polyphaga
- Infraorder: Cucujiformia
- Family: Cerambycidae
- Genus: Aegoschema
- Species: A. migueli

Binomial name
- Aegoschema migueli Monne & Mermudes, 2007

Species of beetle

Aegoschema migueli is a species of beetle in the family Cerambycidae. It was described by Monne and Mermudes in 2007.
