= Aegoschema cinereum =

Scientific classification
- Domain: Eukaryota
- Kingdom: Animalia
- Phylum: Arthropoda
- Class: Insecta
- Order: Coleoptera
- Suborder: Polyphaga
- Infraorder: Cucujiformia
- Family: Cerambycidae
- Genus: Aegoschema
- Species: A. cinereum

Binomial name
- Aegoschema cinereum Lane, 1938

Species of beetle

Aegoschema cinereum is a species of beetle in the family Cerambycidae, also referred to as "lamiinaes" or flat-faced longhorn beetles. It was described by F. Lane in 1938.
