= Aegoschema adspersum =

Scientific classification
- Domain: Eukaryota
- Kingdom: Animalia
- Phylum: Arthropoda
- Class: Insecta
- Order: Coleoptera
- Suborder: Polyphaga
- Infraorder: Cucujiformia
- Family: Cerambycidae
- Genus: Aegoschema
- Species: A. adspersum

Binomial name
- Aegoschema adspersum (Thomson, 1860)

Species of beetle

Aegoschema adspersum is a species of beetle in the family Cerambycidae. It was described by Thomson in 1860.
