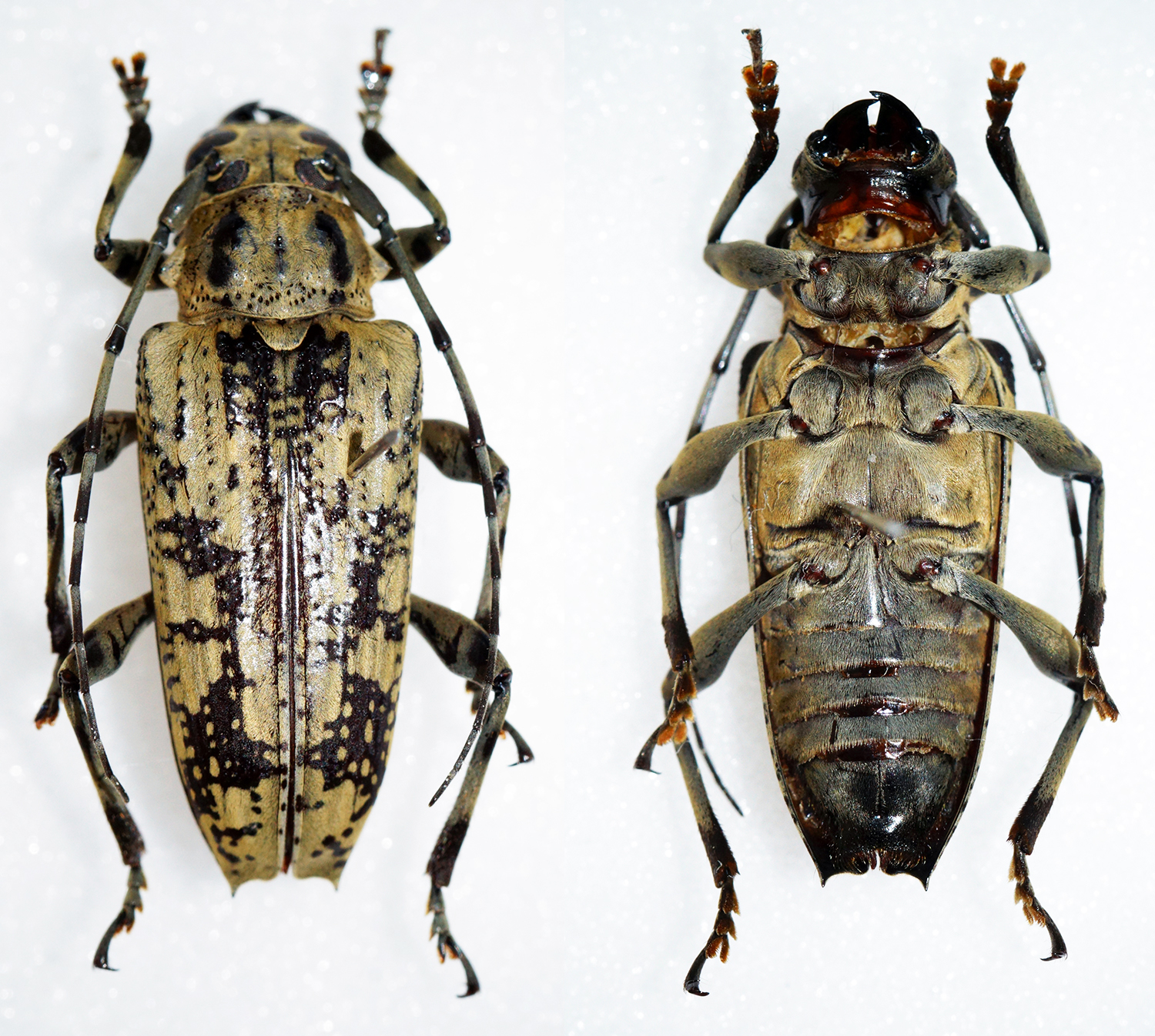
- Aegoschema obesum

Scientific classification
- Domain: Eukaryota
- Kingdom: Animalia
- Phylum: Arthropoda
- Class: Insecta
- Order: Coleoptera
- Suborder: Polyphaga
- Infraorder: Cucujiformia
- Family: Cerambycidae
- Tribe: Acanthoderini
- Genus: Aegoschema; Aurivillius, 1923

Synonyms
- Aegomorphus White, 1855 (nec Aegomorphus Haldeman, 1847)

= Aegoschema =

Genus of beetles

Aegoschema is a genus of beetles in the family Cerambycidae. It contains the following species:

- Aegoschema adspersum (Thomson, 1860)
- Aegoschema barnouini Tavakilian & Neouze, 2013
- Aegoschema cinereum Lane, 1938
- Aegoschema fanchonae Tavakilian & Neouze, 2013
- Aegoschema migueli Monne & Mermudes, 2007
- Aegoschema moniliferum (White, 1855)
- Aegoschema morvanae Tavakilian & Neouze, 2013
- Aegoschema obesum (Bates, 1861)
- Aegoschema peruvianum Lane, 1973
