= Scleronotus scabrosus =

Scientific classification
- Kingdom: Animalia
- Phylum: Arthropoda
- Class: Insecta
- Order: Coleoptera
- Suborder: Polyphaga
- Infraorder: Cucujiformia
- Family: Cerambycidae
- Genus: Scleronotus
- Species: S. scabrosus

Binomial name
- Scleronotus scabrosus Thomson, 1861

Species of beetle

Scleronotus scabrosus is a species of beetle in the family Cerambycidae. It was described by Thomson in 1861.
