= Scleronotus stigosus =

Scientific classification
- Kingdom: Animalia
- Phylum: Arthropoda
- Class: Insecta
- Order: Coleoptera
- Suborder: Polyphaga
- Infraorder: Cucujiformia
- Family: Cerambycidae
- Genus: Scleronotus
- Species: S. stigosus

Binomial name
- Scleronotus stigosus Julio, 1998

Species of beetle

Scleronotus stigosus is a species of beetle in the family Cerambycidae. It was described by Julio in 1998.
