= Scleronotus anthribiformis =

Scientific classification
- Kingdom: Animalia
- Phylum: Arthropoda
- Class: Insecta
- Order: Coleoptera
- Suborder: Polyphaga
- Infraorder: Cucujiformia
- Family: Cerambycidae
- Genus: Scleronotus
- Species: S. anthribiformis

Binomial name
- Scleronotus anthribiformis Aurivillius, 1916

Species of beetle

Scleronotus anthribiformis is a species of beetle in the family Cerambycidae. It was described by Per Olof Christopher Aurivillius in 1916.
