= Scleronotus =

Scientific classification
- Kingdom: Animalia
- Phylum: Arthropoda
- Class: Insecta
- Order: Coleoptera
- Suborder: Polyphaga
- Infraorder: Cucujiformia
- Family: Cerambycidae
- Subfamily: Lamiinae
- Tribe: Acanthoderini
- Genus: Scleronotus; White, 1855

Genus of beetles

Scleronotus is a genus of beetles in the family Cerambycidae, containing the following species:

- Scleronotus angulatus Aurivillius, 1916
- Scleronotus anthribiformis Aurivillius, 1916
- Scleronotus egensis (White, 1855)
- Scleronotus flavosparsus Melzer, 1935
- Scleronotus hirsutus Julio, 1998
- Scleronotus monticellus Julio, 1998
- Scleronotus scabrosus Thomson, 1861
- Scleronotus stigosus Julio, 1998
- Scleronotus stupidus Lacordaire, 1872
- Scleronotus tricarinatus Julio, 1998
