= Scleronotus tricarinatus =

Scientific classification
- Kingdom: Animalia
- Phylum: Arthropoda
- Class: Insecta
- Order: Coleoptera
- Suborder: Polyphaga
- Infraorder: Cucujiformia
- Family: Cerambycidae
- Genus: Scleronotus
- Species: S. tricarinatus

Binomial name
- Scleronotus tricarinatus Julio, 1998

Species of beetle

Scleronotus tricarinatus is a species of beetle in the family Cerambycidae, also known as “long-horned." It was described by Julio in 1998.
