= Scleronotus flavosparsus =

Scientific classification
- Kingdom: Animalia
- Phylum: Arthropoda
- Class: Insecta
- Order: Coleoptera
- Suborder: Polyphaga
- Infraorder: Cucujiformia
- Family: Cerambycidae
- Genus: Scleronotus
- Species: S. flavosparsus

Binomial name
- Scleronotus flavosparsus Melzer, 1935

Species of beetle

Scleronotus flavosparsus is a species of beetle in the family Cerambycidae. It was described by Melzer in 1935.
