= Dufauxia thomasi =

Scientific classification
- Kingdom: Animalia
- Phylum: Arthropoda
- Class: Insecta
- Order: Coleoptera
- Suborder: Polyphaga
- Infraorder: Cucujiformia
- Family: Cerambycidae
- Genus: Dufauxia
- Species: D. thomasi

Binomial name
- Dufauxia thomasi Martins & Galileo, 2007

Species of beetle

Dufauxia thomasi is a species of beetle in the family Cerambycidae. It was described by Martins and Galileo in 2007.
