= Dufauxia kourouana =

Scientific classification
- Kingdom: Animalia
- Phylum: Arthropoda
- Class: Insecta
- Order: Coleoptera
- Suborder: Polyphaga
- Infraorder: Cucujiformia
- Family: Cerambycidae
- Genus: Dufauxia
- Species: D. kourouana

Binomial name
- Dufauxia kourouana Lane, 1970

Species of beetle

Dufauxia kourouana is a species of beetle in the family Cerambycidae. It was described by Lane in 1970.
