= Dufauxia trichocera =

Scientific classification
- Kingdom: Animalia
- Phylum: Arthropoda
- Class: Insecta
- Order: Coleoptera
- Suborder: Polyphaga
- Infraorder: Cucujiformia
- Family: Cerambycidae
- Genus: Dufauxia
- Species: D. trichocera

Binomial name
- Dufauxia trichocera Monné & Magno, 1990

Species of beetle

Dufauxia trichocera is a species of beetle in the family Cerambycidae. It was described by Monné and Magno in 1990.
