= Dufauxia =

Scientific classification
- Kingdom: Animalia
- Phylum: Arthropoda
- Class: Insecta
- Order: Coleoptera
- Suborder: Polyphaga
- Infraorder: Cucujiformia
- Family: Cerambycidae
- Subfamily: Lamiinae
- Tribe: Acanthoderini
- Genus: Dufauxia; Lane, 1955

Genus of beetles

Dufauxia is a genus of beetles in the family Cerambycidae, containing the following species:

- Dufauxia guaicurana Lane, 1955
- Dufauxia kourouana Lane, 1970
- Dufauxia simplex Martins & Galileo, 2003
- Dufauxia thomasi Martins & Galileo, 2007
- Dufauxia trichocera Monné & Magno, 1990
- Dufauxia zikani Lane, 1970
