= Dufauxia guaicurana =

Scientific classification
- Kingdom: Animalia
- Phylum: Arthropoda
- Class: Insecta
- Order: Coleoptera
- Suborder: Polyphaga
- Infraorder: Cucujiformia
- Family: Cerambycidae
- Genus: Dufauxia
- Species: D. guaicurana

Binomial name
- Dufauxia guaicurana Lane, 1955

Species of beetle

Dufauxia guaicurana is a species of beetle in the family Cerambycidae. It was described by Lane in 1955.
