= Zikanita plumbea =

Scientific classification
- Kingdom: Animalia
- Phylum: Arthropoda
- Class: Insecta
- Order: Coleoptera
- Suborder: Polyphaga
- Infraorder: Cucujiformia
- Family: Cerambycidae
- Genus: Zikanita
- Species: Z. plumbea

Binomial name
- Zikanita plumbea Machado & Monne, 2011

Species of beetle

Zikanita plumbea is a species of beetle in the family Cerambycidae. It was described by Vanessa S. Machado and Marcela L. Monné in 2011.
