= Zikanita argenteofasciata =

Scientific classification
- Kingdom: Animalia
- Phylum: Arthropoda
- Class: Insecta
- Order: Coleoptera
- Suborder: Polyphaga
- Infraorder: Cucujiformia
- Family: Cerambycidae
- Genus: Zikanita
- Species: Z. argenteofasciata

Binomial name
- Zikanita argenteofasciata (Tippmann, 1960)

Species of beetle

Zikanita argenteofasciata is a species of longhorn beetle in the family Cerambycidae, the subfamily Lamiinae, in the tribe Acanthocerini. It was described by Tippmann in 1960. The insect is local to Peru.
