= Zikanita =

Scientific classification
- Kingdom: Animalia
- Phylum: Arthropoda
- Class: Insecta
- Order: Coleoptera
- Suborder: Polyphaga
- Infraorder: Cucujiformia
- Family: Cerambycidae
- Subfamily: Lamiinae
- Tribe: Acanthoderini
- Genus: Zikanita; Lane, 1943

Genus of beetles

Zikanita is a genus of beetles in the family Cerambycidae, containing the following species:

- Zikanita argenteofasciata (Tippmann, 1960)
- Zikanita biocellata (Tippmann, 1960)
- Zikanita perpulchra Lane, 1943
- Zikanita plumbea Machado & Monne, 2011
