= Zikanita perpulchra =

Scientific classification
- Kingdom: Animalia
- Phylum: Arthropoda
- Class: Insecta
- Order: Coleoptera
- Suborder: Polyphaga
- Infraorder: Cucujiformia
- Family: Cerambycidae
- Genus: Zikanita
- Species: Z. perpulchra

Binomial name
- Zikanita perpulchra Lane, 1943

Species of beetle

Zikanita perpulchra is a species of beetle in the family Cerambycidae. It was described by Lane in 1943.
