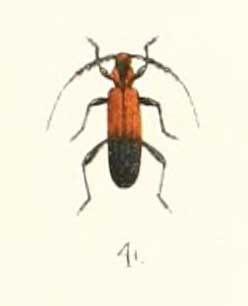

Scientific classification
- Domain: Eukaryota
- Kingdom: Animalia
- Phylum: Arthropoda
- Class: Insecta
- Order: Coleoptera
- Suborder: Polyphaga
- Infraorder: Cucujiformia
- Family: Cerambycidae
- Subfamily: Cerambycinae
- Tribe: Pteroplatini; Thomson, 1860

= Pteroplatini =

Tribe of beetles

Pteroplatini is a tribe of beetles in the subfamily Cerambycinae, containing the following genera:

- Aphylax
- Corynellus
- Cosmoplatidius
- Cosmoplatus
- Deltosoma
- Nubosoplatus
- Pteroplatus
- Thelgetra
