= Orthostoma chryseis =

Scientific classification
- Kingdom: Animalia
- Phylum: Arthropoda
- Class: Insecta
- Order: Coleoptera
- Suborder: Polyphaga
- Infraorder: Cucujiformia
- Family: Cerambycidae
- Subfamily: Cerambycinae
- Tribe: Compsocerini
- Genus: Orthostoma
- Species: O. chryseis

Binomial name
- Orthostoma chryseis (Bates, 1870)

Synonyms
- Orthoschema chryseis Blackwelder, 1946

Species of beetle

Orthostoma chryseis is a species in the longhorn beetle family Cerambycidae. It is found in Brazil, French Guiana, and Surinam.
