= Mimochariergus carbonelli =

Scientific classification
- Domain: Eukaryota
- Kingdom: Animalia
- Phylum: Arthropoda
- Class: Insecta
- Order: Coleoptera
- Suborder: Polyphaga
- Infraorder: Cucujiformia
- Family: Cerambycidae
- Subfamily: Cerambycinae
- Tribe: Compsocerini
- Genus: Mimochariergus
- Species: M. carbonelli

Binomial name
- Mimochariergus carbonelli Zajciw, 1960

Species of beetle

Mimochariergus carbonelli is a species in the longhorn beetle family Cerambycidae. It is found in Argentina, Brazil, Paraguay, and Uruguay.

This species was described by Dmytro Zajciw in 1960.
