= Cosmoplatidius simulans =

Scientific classification
- Domain: Eukaryota
- Kingdom: Animalia
- Phylum: Arthropoda
- Class: Insecta
- Order: Coleoptera
- Suborder: Polyphaga
- Infraorder: Cucujiformia
- Family: Cerambycidae
- Subfamily: Cerambycinae
- Tribe: Compsocerini
- Genus: Cosmoplatidius
- Species: C. simulans

Binomial name
- Cosmoplatidius simulans (Bates, 1870)

Synonyms
- Cosmoplatidius mandibularis Aurivillius, 1912; Cosmoplatus mandibularis Blackwelder, 1946; Pteroplatus simulans Chemsak, 1967

Species of beetle

Cosmoplatidius simulans is a species in the longhorn beetle family Cerambycidae. It is found in Ecuador, French Guiana, Brazil, Bolivia, and Peru.
