= Chaetosopus infalsatus =

Scientific classification
- Kingdom: Animalia
- Phylum: Arthropoda
- Class: Insecta
- Order: Coleoptera
- Suborder: Polyphaga
- Infraorder: Cucujiformia
- Family: Cerambycidae
- Subfamily: Cerambycinae
- Tribe: Compsocerini
- Genus: Chaetosopus
- Species: C. infalsatus

Binomial name
- Chaetosopus infalsatus Napp & Martins, 1988

Species of beetle

Chaetosopus infalsatus is a species in the longhorn beetle family Cerambycidae. It is found in Brazil.
