= Chaetosopus violaceus =

Scientific classification
- Kingdom: Animalia
- Phylum: Arthropoda
- Class: Insecta
- Order: Coleoptera
- Suborder: Polyphaga
- Infraorder: Cucujiformia
- Family: Cerambycidae
- Subfamily: Cerambycinae
- Tribe: Compsocerini
- Genus: Chaetosopus
- Species: C. violaceus

Binomial name
- Chaetosopus violaceus (Martins, 1973)

Synonyms
- Euryprosopus violaceus Martins, 1973

Species of beetle

Chaetosopus violaceus is a species in the longhorn beetle family Cerambycidae. It is found in Brazil.
