= Dilocerus brunneus =

Scientific classification
- Domain: Eukaryota
- Kingdom: Animalia
- Phylum: Arthropoda
- Class: Insecta
- Order: Coleoptera
- Suborder: Polyphaga
- Infraorder: Cucujiformia
- Family: Cerambycidae
- Subfamily: Cerambycinae
- Tribe: Compsocerini
- Genus: Dilocerus
- Species: D. brunneus

Binomial name
- Dilocerus brunneus Napp & Martins, 2006

Species of beetle

Dilocerus brunneus is a species in the longhorn beetle family Cerambycidae, found in Bolivia.
