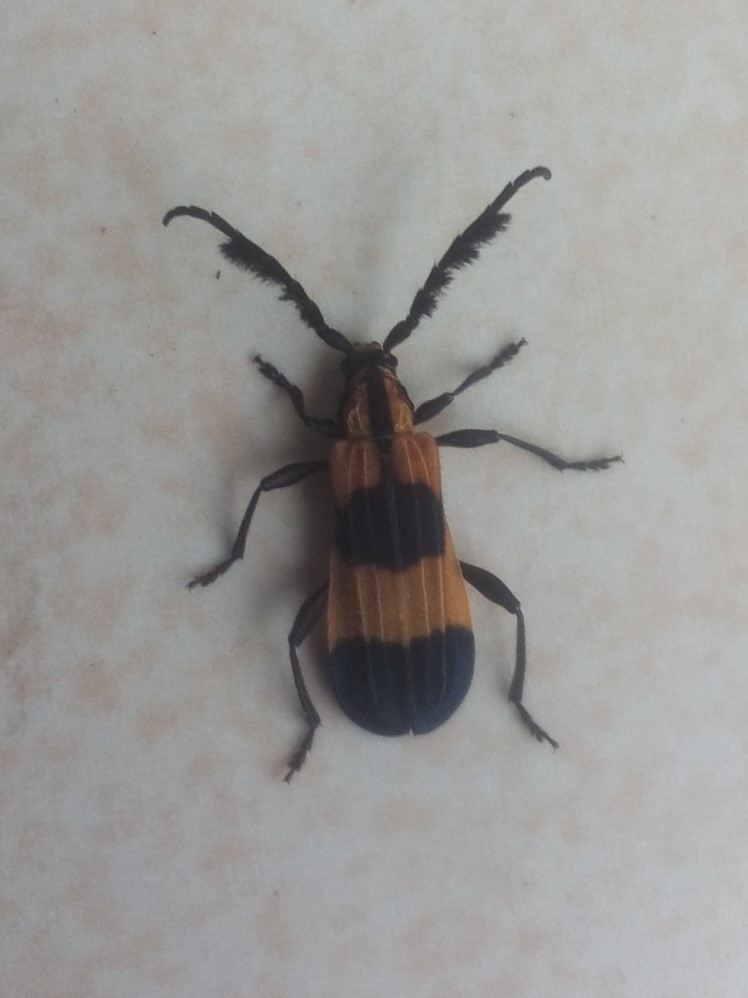
- Pteroplatus quadriscopulatus

Scientific classification
- Domain: Eukaryota
- Kingdom: Animalia
- Phylum: Arthropoda
- Class: Insecta
- Order: Coleoptera
- Suborder: Polyphaga
- Infraorder: Cucujiformia
- Family: Cerambycidae
- Subfamily: Cerambycinae
- Tribe: Pteroplatini
- Genus: Pteroplatus; Buquet, 1840

= Pteroplatus =

Genus of beetles

Pteroplatus is a genus of beetles in the family Cerambycidae, containing the following species:

- Pteroplatus anchora Belon, 1903
- Pteroplatus arrogans Buquet, 1840
- Pteroplatus atroviolaceus Kirsch, 1889
- Pteroplatus bilineatus Buquet, 1841
- Pteroplatus dimidiatipennis Buquet, 1841
- Pteroplatus elegans Buquet, 1841
- Pteroplatus fasciatus Buquet, 1841
- Pteroplatus gracilis Buquet, 1840
- Pteroplatus nigriventris Breme, 1844
- Pteroplatus pulcher Buquet, 1840
- Pteroplatus quadriscopulatus Bates, 1880
- Pteroplatus rostainei Buquet, 1840
- Pteroplatus suturalis Buquet, 1840
- Pteroplatus transversalis Breme, 1844
- Pteroplatus variabilis Sallé, 1849
