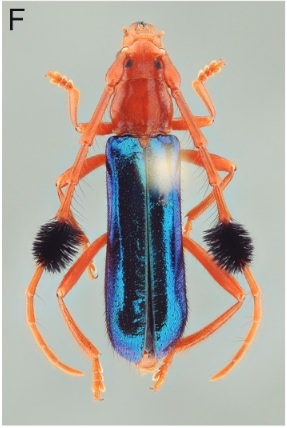

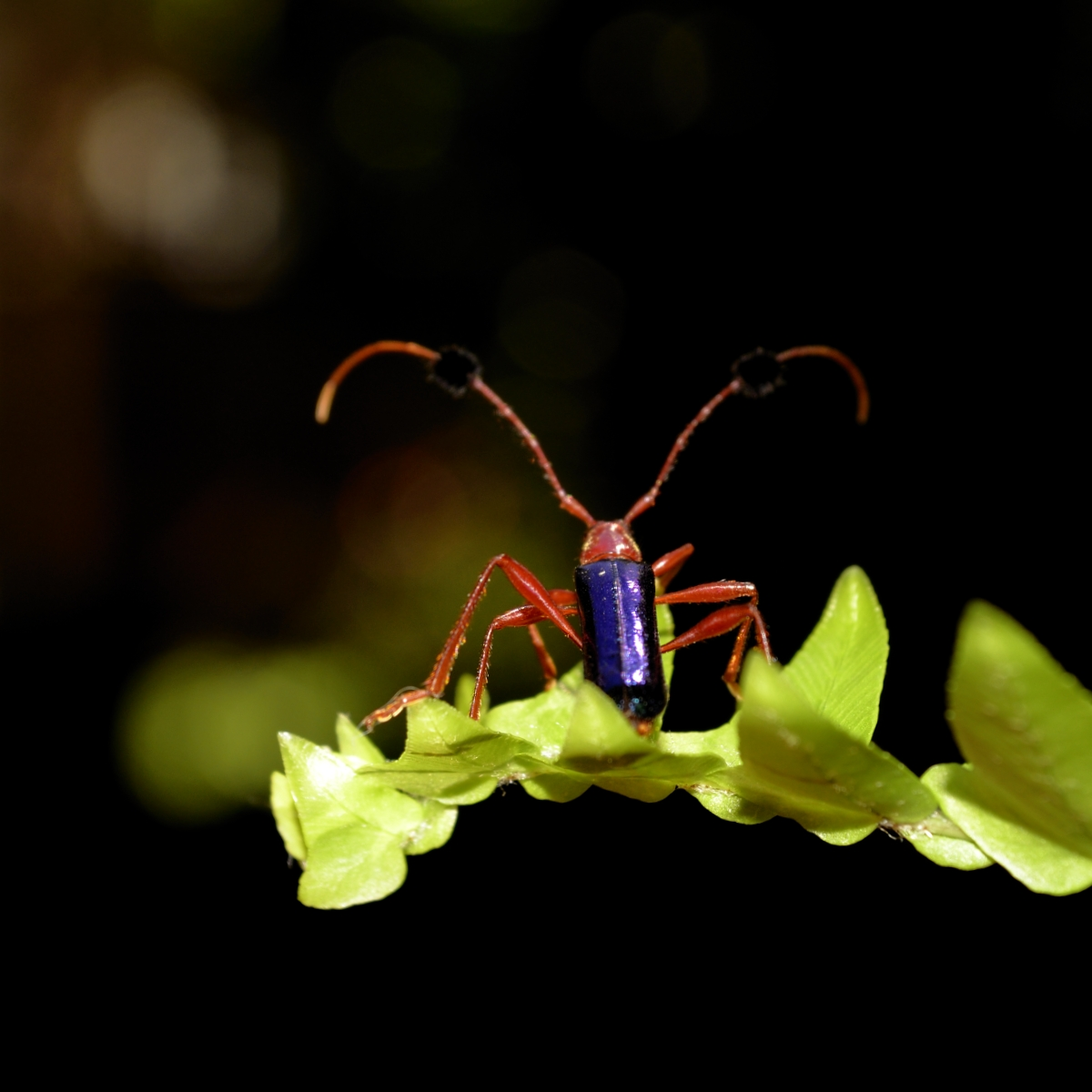

Scientific classification
- Kingdom: Animalia
- Phylum: Arthropoda
- Clade: Pancrustacea
- Class: Insecta
- Order: Coleoptera
- Suborder: Polyphaga
- Infraorder: Cucujiformia
- Family: Cerambycidae
- Subfamily: Cerambycinae
- Tribe: Compsocerini
- Genus: Compsocerus
- Species: C. violaceus

Binomial name
- Compsocerus violaceus (White, 1853)

Synonyms
- Compsocera aulica Thomson, 1861; Compsocerus aulicus Burmeister, 1879; Compsocerus equestre Viana, 1972; Compsocerus equestris Monné & Zajciw, 1970; Compsocerus igneus Lacordaire, 1869; Compsocerus thyrsophorus Gemminger & Harold, 1872; Orthostoma violaceum White, 1853

= Compsocerus violaceus =

Species of beetle

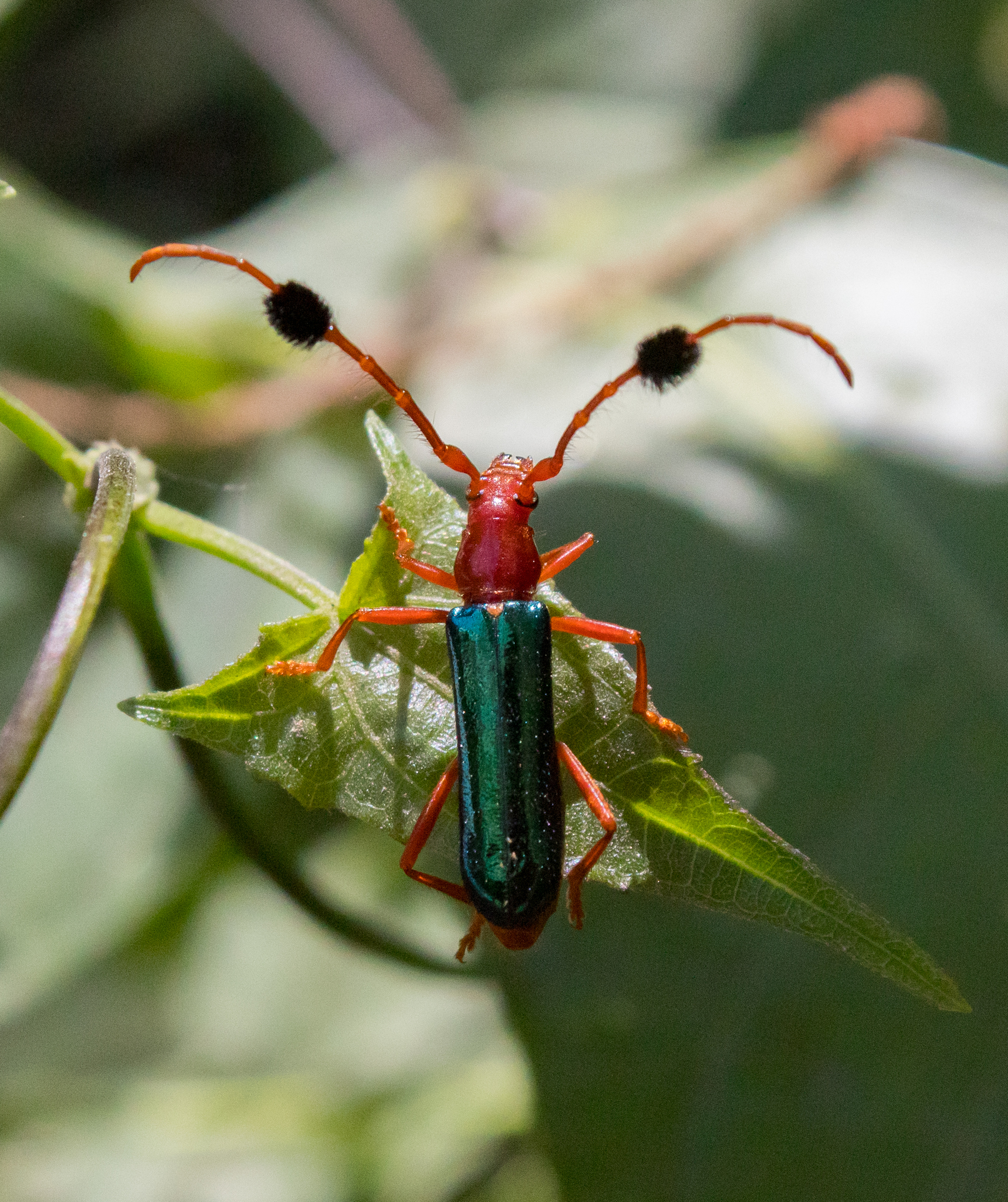
Compsocerus violaceus, Brazil

Compsocerus violaceus is a species of beetle in the family Cerambycidae. It occurs in South America, being common in southern Brazil, northern Argentina and Uruguay.

== Agricultural pest ==
Compsocerus violaceus is considered an agricultural pest, attacking several cultivated tree species, such as acacias, eucalypts, willows, fig trees, citrus trees and peach trees. Eggs are laid on tree trunks, usually inside small fissures in the bark. After eclosion, the larvae build a gallery below the bark in branches with diameters between two and six cm and start to feed on the wood, taking about ten months to become adults. Adults have been reported to feed on fruits, flowers, and sap leaking from injured tree trunks.

Species that serve as host for Compsocerus violaceus include:

- Anacardiaceae:
  - Schinopsis balansae Engl.
  - Schinus molle L.
- Celastraceae:
  - Euonymus japonicus Thunb.
- Fabaceae:
  - Acacia dealbata Link
  - Acacia melanoxylon R. Br.
  - Acacia praecox Griseb.
  - Acacia visco Griseb.
  - Adenanthera colubrina var. cebil (Griseb.) Altschul
  - Bauhinia forficata subsp. pruinosa (Vogel) Fortunato & Wunderlin
  - Calliandra tweedii Benth.
  - Cercis siliquastrum L.
  - Mimosa polycarpa var. spegazzinii Burkart
  - Prosopis affinis Spreng.
  - Prosopis hassleri Harms
  - Prosopis nigra Hieron.
  - Sesbania virgata (Cav.) Pers.
- Fagaceae:
  - Castanea sativa Mill.
  - Quercus robur L.
- Juglandaceae:
  - Carya illinoinensis (Wangenh.) K. Koch
- Lauraceae:
  - Laurus nobilis L.
- Lythraceae:
  - Punica granatum L.
- Moraceae:
  - Ficus sp.
- Myrtaceae:
  - Eucalyptus sp.
- Oleaceae:
  - Ligustrum lucidum W.T.Aiton
- Pinaceae:
  - Pinus sp.
- Rosaceae:
  - Cerasus vulgaris Mill.
  - Crataegus sp.
  - Mespilus germanica L.
  - Prunus domestica L.
  - Rosa sp.
- Rutaceae:
  - Citrus aurantium L.
  - Citrus limon (L.) Burm. f.
  - Citrus sinensis (L.) Osbeck
- Salicaceae:
  - Salix fragilis L.
- Sapindaceae:
  - Dodonaea viscosa Jacq.
- Sapotaceae:
  - Chrysophyllum gonocarpum (Mart. & Eichler ex Miq.) Engl.
- Ulmaceae:
  - Ulmus pumila L.
