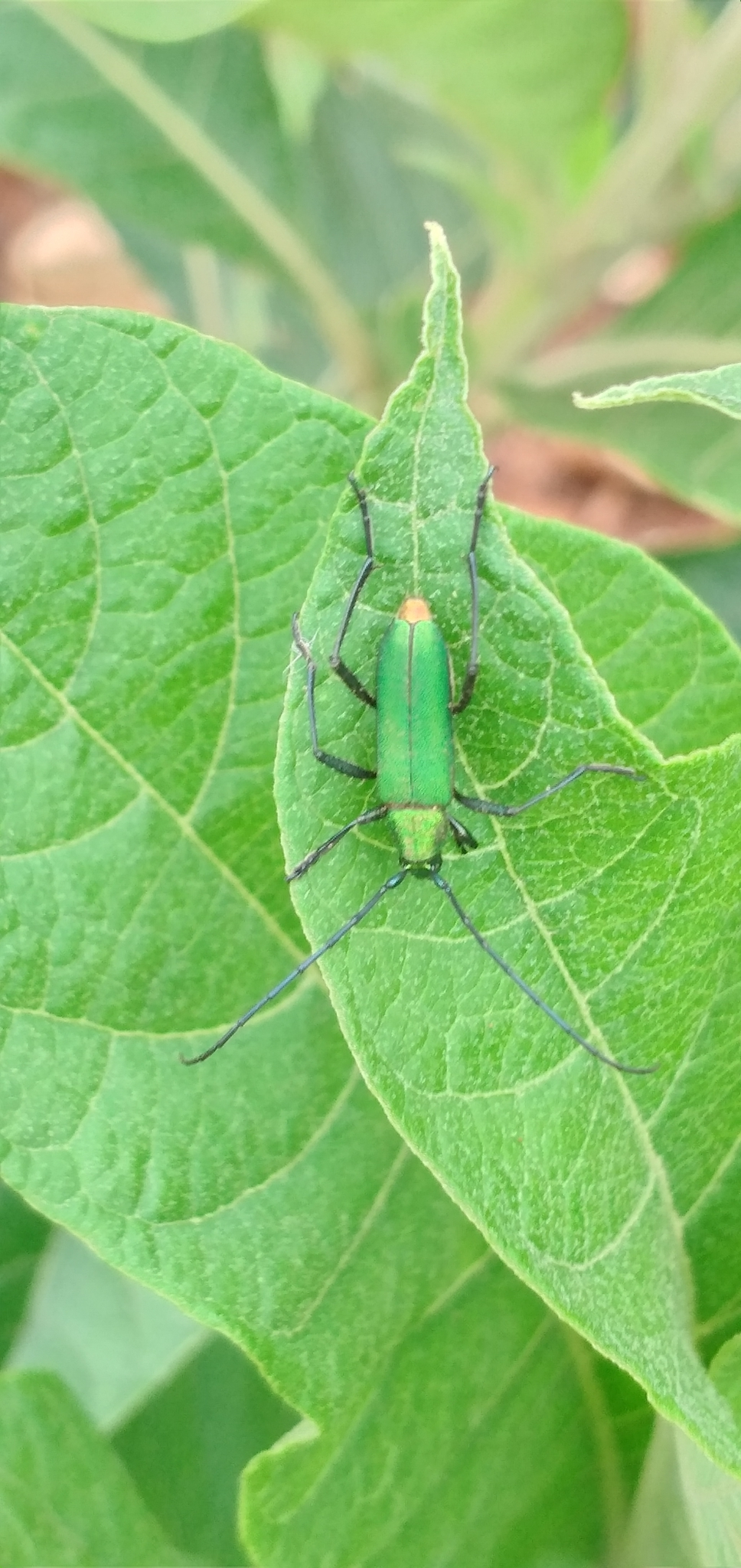
- In Brazil

Scientific classification
- Kingdom: Animalia
- Phylum: Arthropoda
- Clade: Pancrustacea
- Class: Insecta
- Order: Coleoptera
- Suborder: Polyphaga
- Infraorder: Cucujiformia
- Family: Cerambycidae
- Subfamily: Cerambycinae
- Tribe: Compsocerini
- Genus: Orthostoma
- Species: O. abdominale

Binomial name
- Orthostoma abdominale (Gyllenhal, 1817)

Synonyms
- List: Callichroma abdominalis Dejean, 1821; Cerambyx abdominalis Gyllenhal, 1817; Orthoprasis abdominalis Aurivillius, 1926; Orthoschema abdominale Aurivillius, 1912; Orthoschema abdominalis Lacordaire, 1869; Orthoschema tenuicorne Monné, 1993; Orthoschema tenuicornis Blackwelder, 1946; Orthostoma abdominalis Monné & Giesbert, 1994; Orthostoma tenuicorne Gemminger & Harold, 1872

= Orthostoma abdominale =

Species of beetle

Orthostoma abdominale is a species of longhorn beetle in the family Cerambycidae. It is found in Bolivia, Brazil, Colombia, Ecuador, Paraguay, and Peru.
