= Cosmoplatidius lycoides =

Scientific classification
- Kingdom: Animalia
- Phylum: Arthropoda
- Clade: Pancrustacea
- Class: Insecta
- Order: Coleoptera
- Suborder: Polyphaga
- Infraorder: Cucujiformia
- Family: Cerambycidae
- Subfamily: Cerambycinae
- Tribe: Compsocerini
- Genus: Cosmoplatidius
- Species: C. lycoides

Binomial name
- Cosmoplatidius lycoides (Guérin-Méneville, 1844)

Synonyms
- Cosmoplatidius annulipes Tavakilian, 1991; Cosmoplatus annulipes Blackwelder, 1946; Pteroplatus annulipes Gemminger & Harold, 1872; Pteroplatus lycoides Lacordaire, 1869

Species of beetle

Cosmoplatidius lycoides is a species in the longhorn beetle family Cerambycidae, found in Brazil, Bolivia, French Guiana, and Guyana.

This species was described by Félix Édouard Guérin-Méneville in 1844.
