= Caperonotus cardinalis =

Scientific classification
- Kingdom: Animalia
- Phylum: Arthropoda
- Class: Insecta
- Order: Coleoptera
- Suborder: Polyphaga
- Infraorder: Cucujiformia
- Family: Cerambycidae
- Subfamily: Cerambycinae
- Tribe: Compsocerini
- Genus: Caperonotus
- Species: C. cardinalis

Binomial name
- Caperonotus cardinalis (Bates, 1870)

Synonyms
- Orthoschema cardinale Aurivillius, 1912; Orthoschema cardinalis Blackwelder, 1946; Orthostoma cardinale Gemminger & Harold, 1872

Species of beetle

Caperonotus cardinalis is a species in the longhorn beetle family Cerambycidae. It is found in Brazil and Peru.
