= Mimochariergus fluminensis =

Scientific classification
- Domain: Eukaryota
- Kingdom: Animalia
- Phylum: Arthropoda
- Class: Insecta
- Order: Coleoptera
- Suborder: Polyphaga
- Infraorder: Cucujiformia
- Family: Cerambycidae
- Subfamily: Cerambycinae
- Tribe: Compsocerini
- Genus: Mimochariergus
- Species: M. fluminensis

Binomial name
- Mimochariergus fluminensis Napp & Mermudes, 1999

Species of beetle

Mimochariergus fluminensis is a species in the longhorn beetle family Cerambycidae. It is found in Brazil.
