= Compsocerus deceptor =

Scientific classification
- Domain: Eukaryota
- Kingdom: Animalia
- Phylum: Arthropoda
- Class: Insecta
- Order: Coleoptera
- Suborder: Polyphaga
- Infraorder: Cucujiformia
- Family: Cerambycidae
- Subfamily: Cerambycinae
- Tribe: Compsocerini
- Genus: Compsocerus
- Species: C. deceptor

Binomial name
- Compsocerus deceptor Napp, 1976

Synonyms
- Compsocerus barbicornis Schwarzer, 1923; Saperda barbicornis Melzer, 1918

Species of beetle

Compsocerus deceptor is a species of Long-Horned Beetle in the beetle family Cerambycidae. It is found in Brazil.
