= Chlorethe lalannecassoui =

Scientific classification
- Domain: Eukaryota
- Kingdom: Animalia
- Phylum: Arthropoda
- Class: Insecta
- Order: Coleoptera
- Suborder: Polyphaga
- Infraorder: Cucujiformia
- Family: Cerambycidae
- Subfamily: Cerambycinae
- Tribe: Compsocerini
- Genus: Chlorethe
- Species: C. lalannecassoui

Binomial name
- Chlorethe lalannecassoui Dalens, Tavakilian & Touroult, 2010

Species of beetle

Chlorethe lalannecassoui is a species in the longhorn beetle family Cerambycidae. It is found in French Guiana.
