= Compsocerus barbicornis =

Scientific classification
- Domain: Eukaryota
- Kingdom: Animalia
- Phylum: Arthropoda
- Class: Insecta
- Order: Coleoptera
- Suborder: Polyphaga
- Infraorder: Cucujiformia
- Family: Cerambycidae
- Subfamily: Cerambycinae
- Tribe: Compsocerini
- Genus: Compsocerus
- Species: C. barbicornis

Binomial name
- Compsocerus barbicornis Audinet-Serville, 1834

Synonyms
- Compsocerus opacipennis Blackwelder, 1946

Species of beetle

Compsocerus barbicornis is a species of Long-Horned Beetle in the beetle family Cerambycidae. It is found in Brazil.
