= Chlorethe scabrosa =

Scientific classification
- Domain: Eukaryota
- Kingdom: Animalia
- Phylum: Arthropoda
- Class: Insecta
- Order: Coleoptera
- Suborder: Polyphaga
- Infraorder: Cucujiformia
- Family: Cerambycidae
- Subfamily: Cerambycinae
- Tribe: Compsocerini
- Genus: Chlorethe
- Species: C. scabrosa

Binomial name
- Chlorethe scabrosa Zajciw, 1963

Synonyms
- Chlorete scabrosa Di Iorio, 2006

Species of beetle

Chlorethe scabrosa is a species in the longhorn beetle family Cerambycidae. It is found in Argentina and Brazil.

This species was described by Dmytro Zajciw in 1963.
