= Orthostoma vittata =

Scientific classification
- Kingdom: Animalia
- Phylum: Arthropoda
- Class: Insecta
- Order: Coleoptera
- Suborder: Polyphaga
- Infraorder: Cucujiformia
- Family: Cerambycidae
- Subfamily: Cerambycinae
- Tribe: Compsocerini
- Genus: Orthostoma
- Species: O. vittata

Binomial name
- Orthostoma vittata (Aurivillius, 1910)

Synonyms
- Orthoschema vittata Blackwelder, 1946; Orthoschema vittatum Saalas, 1936; Orthostoma vittatum Monné & Giesbert, 1994

Species of beetle

Orthostoma vittata is a species in the longhorn beetle family Cerambycidae. It is found in Venezuela.

This species was described by Per Olof Christopher Aurivillius in 1910.
