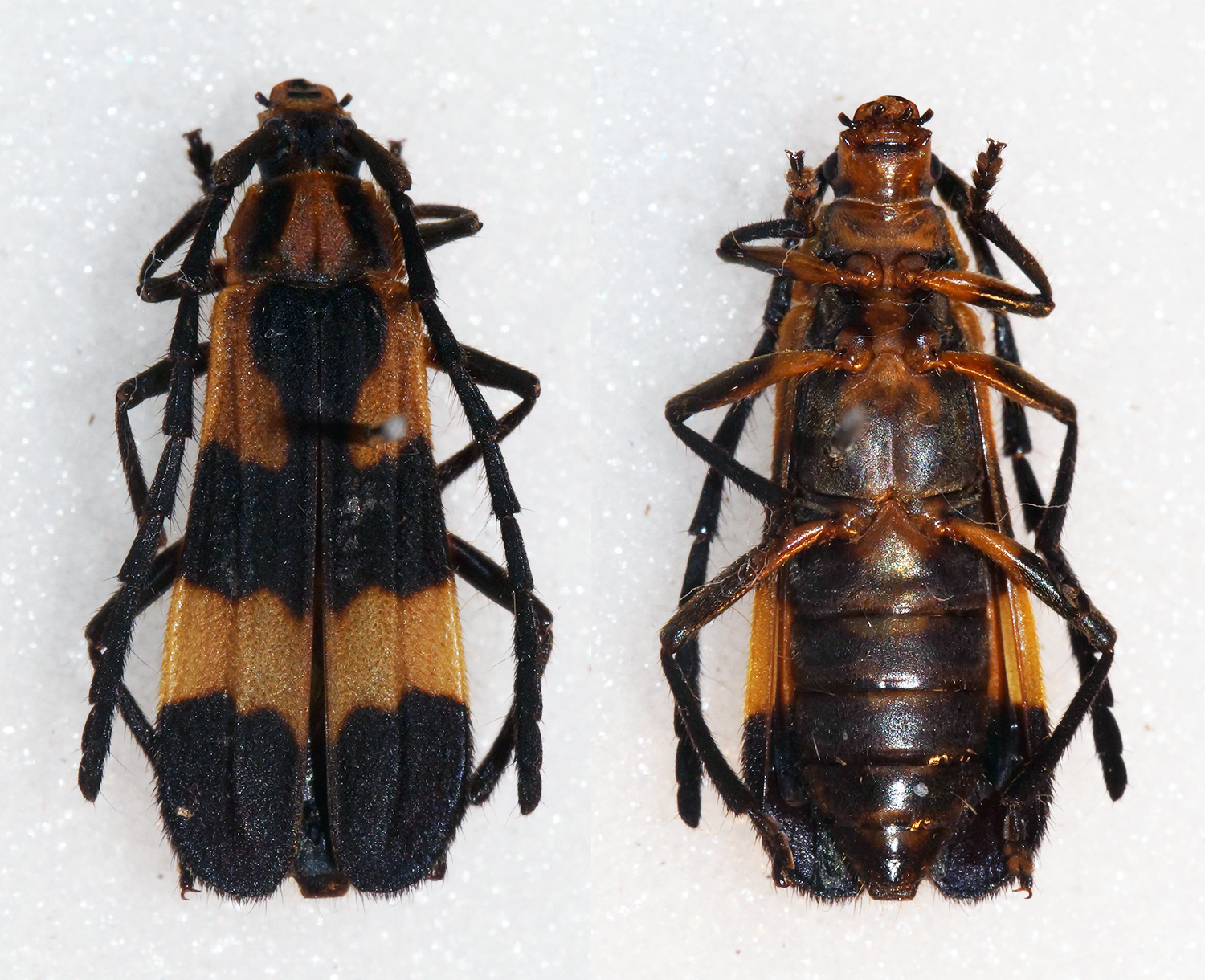

Scientific classification
- Domain: Eukaryota
- Kingdom: Animalia
- Phylum: Arthropoda
- Class: Insecta
- Order: Coleoptera
- Suborder: Polyphaga
- Infraorder: Cucujiformia
- Family: Cerambycidae
- Subfamily: Cerambycinae
- Tribe: Compsocerini
- Genus: Cosmoplatidius
- Species: C. abare

Binomial name
- Cosmoplatidius abare Napp & Martins, 2006

= Cosmoplatidius abare =

Species of beetle

Cosmoplatidius abare is a species in the longhorn beetle family Cerambycidae. It is found in Bolivia, Brazil, and Peru.
