= Compsocerus proximus =

Scientific classification
- Domain: Eukaryota
- Kingdom: Animalia
- Phylum: Arthropoda
- Class: Insecta
- Order: Coleoptera
- Suborder: Polyphaga
- Infraorder: Cucujiformia
- Family: Cerambycidae
- Subfamily: Cerambycinae
- Tribe: Compsocerini
- Genus: Compsocerus
- Species: C. proximus

Binomial name
- Compsocerus proximus Napp, 1977

Species of beetle

Compsocerus proximus is a species of Long-Horned Beetle in the beetle family Cerambycidae. It is found in Argentina, Bolivia, and Brazil.
