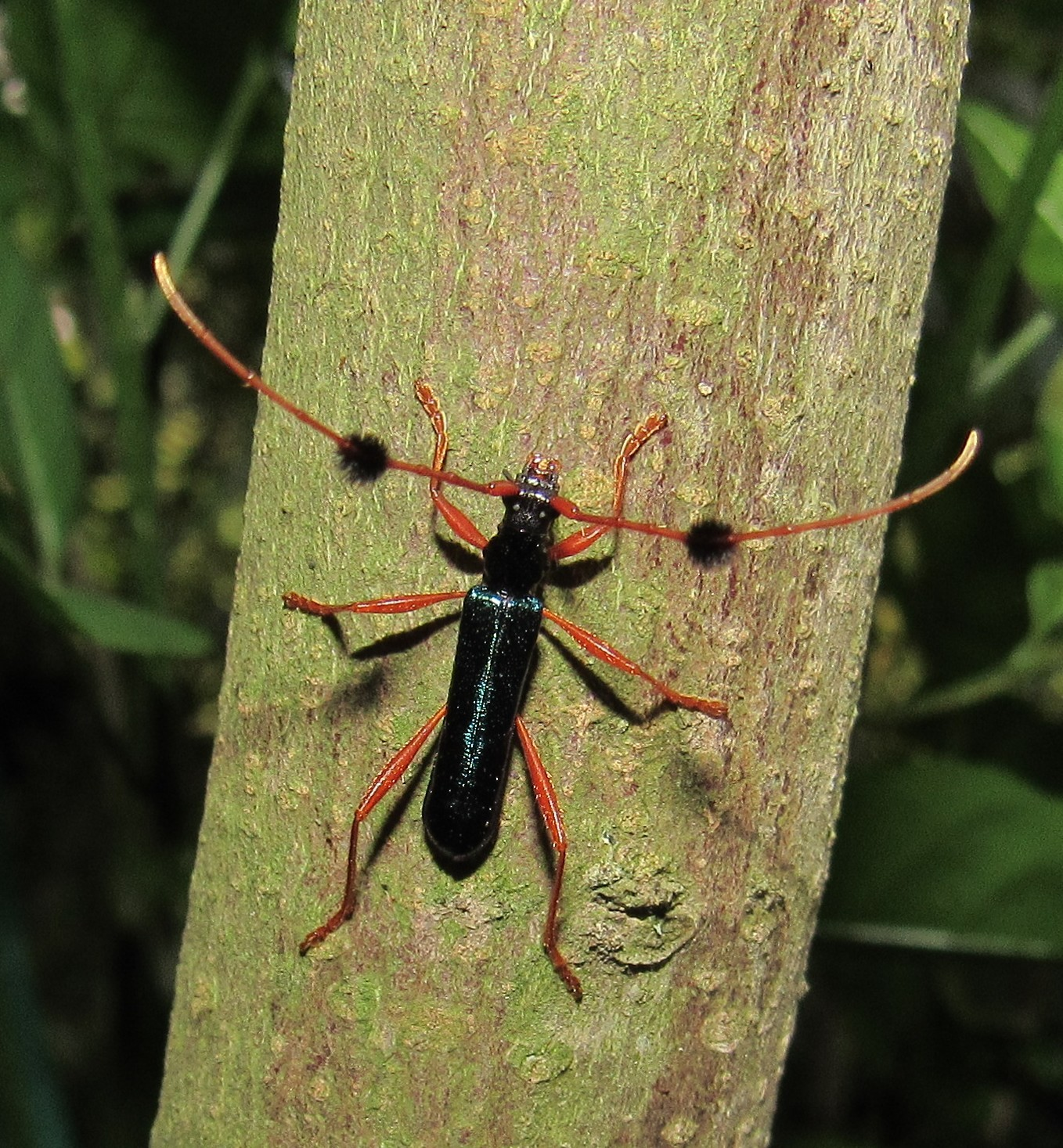
- Compsocerus chevrolati, Brasil

Scientific classification
- Domain: Eukaryota
- Kingdom: Animalia
- Phylum: Arthropoda
- Class: Insecta
- Order: Coleoptera
- Suborder: Polyphaga
- Infraorder: Cucujiformia
- Family: Cerambycidae
- Subfamily: Cerambycinae
- Tribe: Compsocerini
- Genus: Compsocerus
- Species: C. chevrolati

Binomial name
- Compsocerus chevrolati Gounelle, 1910

= Compsocerus chevrolati =

Species of beetle

Compsocerus chevrolati is a species of Long-Horned Beetle in the beetle family Cerambycidae. It is found in Brazil.
