= Dilocerus marinonii =

Scientific classification
- Domain: Eukaryota
- Kingdom: Animalia
- Phylum: Arthropoda
- Class: Insecta
- Order: Coleoptera
- Suborder: Polyphaga
- Infraorder: Cucujiformia
- Family: Cerambycidae
- Subfamily: Cerambycinae
- Tribe: Compsocerini
- Genus: Dilocerus
- Species: D. marinonii

Binomial name
- Dilocerus marinonii Napp, 1980

Species of beetle

Dilocerus marinonii is a species in the longhorn beetle family Cerambycidae. It is found in Argentina and Bolivia.
