= Chlorethe ingae =

Scientific classification
- Domain: Eukaryota
- Kingdom: Animalia
- Phylum: Arthropoda
- Class: Insecta
- Order: Coleoptera
- Suborder: Polyphaga
- Infraorder: Cucujiformia
- Family: Cerambycidae
- Subfamily: Cerambycinae
- Tribe: Compsocerini
- Genus: Chlorethe
- Species: C. ingae

Binomial name
- Chlorethe ingae Bates, 1867

Synonyms
- Chimoreia mandibularis Monné & Giesbert, 1994

Species of beetle

Chlorethe ingae is a species in the longhorn beetle family Cerambycidae. It is found in Bolivia, Brazil, Ecuador, French Guiana, and Peru.
