= Caperonotus guianensis =

Scientific classification
- Kingdom: Animalia
- Phylum: Arthropoda
- Class: Insecta
- Order: Coleoptera
- Suborder: Polyphaga
- Infraorder: Cucujiformia
- Family: Cerambycidae
- Subfamily: Cerambycinae
- Tribe: Compsocerini
- Genus: Caperonotus
- Species: C. guianensis

Binomial name
- Caperonotus guianensis Dalens & Touroult, 2009

Species of beetle

Caperonotus guianensis is a species in the longhorn beetle family Cerambycidae. It is found in French Guiana.
