= Cosmisomopsis =

Scientific classification
- Kingdom: Animalia
- Phylum: Arthropoda
- Clade: Pancrustacea
- Class: Insecta
- Order: Coleoptera
- Suborder: Polyphaga
- Infraorder: Cucujiformia
- Family: Cerambycidae
- Tribe: Compsocerini
- Genus: Cosmisomopsis; Zajciw, 1960
- Species: C. viridis

Binomial name
- Cosmisomopsis viridis Zajciw, 1960

Genus of beetles

Cosmisomopsis is a genus in the longhorn beetle family Cerambycidae. This genus has a single species, Cosmisomopsis viridis, found in Argentina, Brazil, and Bolivia. Its occurrence in Bolivia was first reported by Vlasak and Devesa in 2026.

Physical Description
