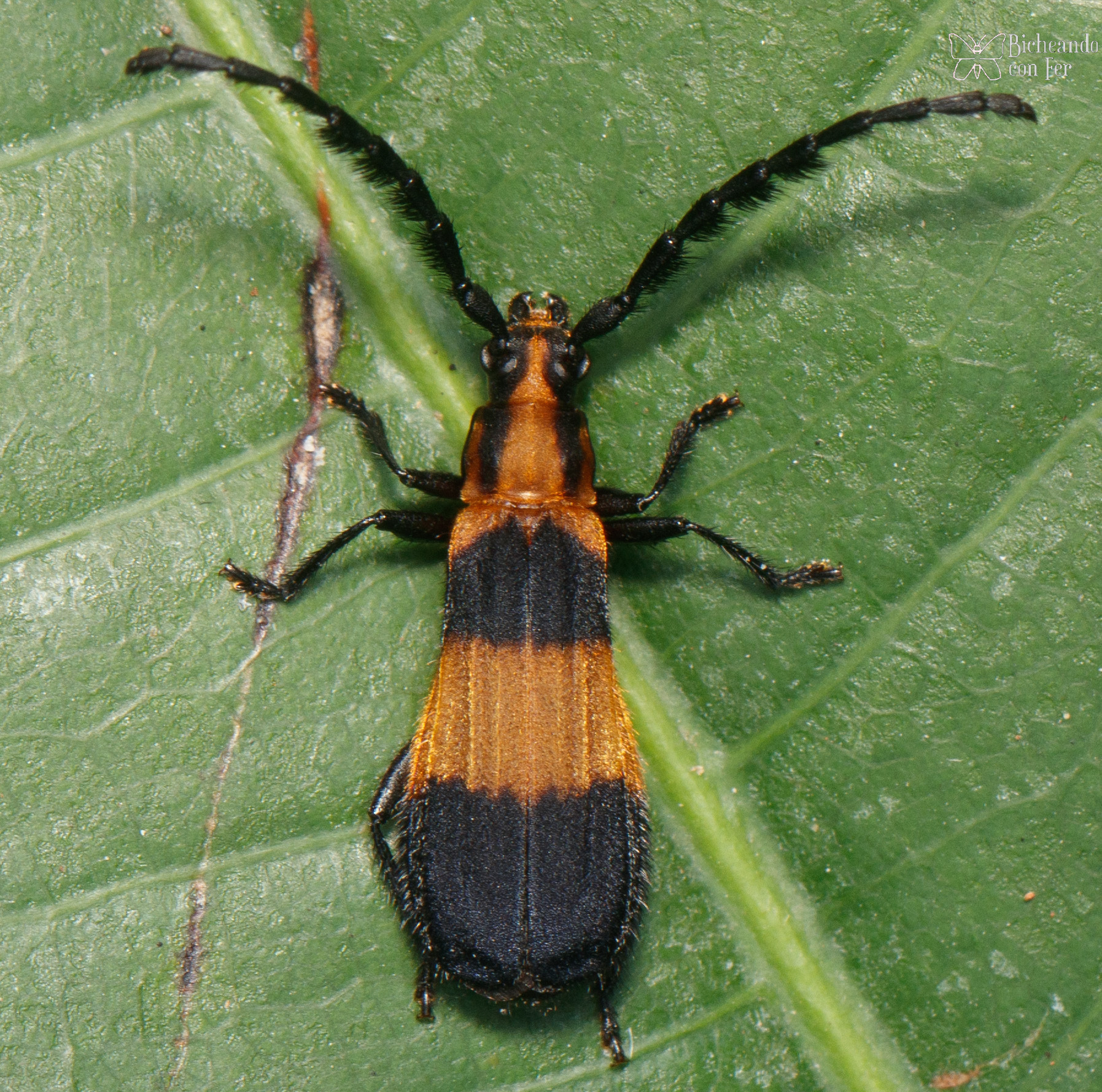
- Cosmoplatidius bilineatus, México

Scientific classification
- Domain: Eukaryota
- Kingdom: Animalia
- Phylum: Arthropoda
- Class: Insecta
- Order: Coleoptera
- Suborder: Polyphaga
- Infraorder: Cucujiformia
- Family: Cerambycidae
- Subfamily: Cerambycinae
- Tribe: Compsocerini
- Genus: Cosmoplatidius
- Species: C. bilineatus

Binomial name
- Cosmoplatidius bilineatus (Buquet, 1841)

= Cosmoplatidius bilineatus =

Species of beetle

Cosmoplatidius bilineatus is a species in the longhorn beetle family Cerambycidae. It is found in Mexico, Central America, South America, and the Caribbean.
