= Aglaoschema mourei =

Scientific classification
- Kingdom: Animalia
- Phylum: Arthropoda
- Class: Insecta
- Order: Coleoptera
- Suborder: Polyphaga
- Infraorder: Cucujiformia
- Family: Cerambycidae
- Genus: Aglaoschema
- Species: A. mourei

Binomial name
- Aglaoschema mourei (Napp, 1993)

Species of beetle

Aglaoschema mourei is a species of beetle in the family Cerambycidae. It was described by Napp in 1993.
