= Aglaoschema cyaneum =

Scientific classification
- Kingdom: Animalia
- Phylum: Arthropoda
- Class: Insecta
- Order: Coleoptera
- Suborder: Polyphaga
- Infraorder: Cucujiformia
- Family: Cerambycidae
- Genus: Aglaoschema
- Species: A. cyaneum

Binomial name
- Aglaoschema cyaneum (Pascoe, 1860)

Species of beetle

Aglaoschema cyaneum is a species of beetle in the family Cerambycidae. It was described by Francis Polkinghorne Pascoe in 1860.
