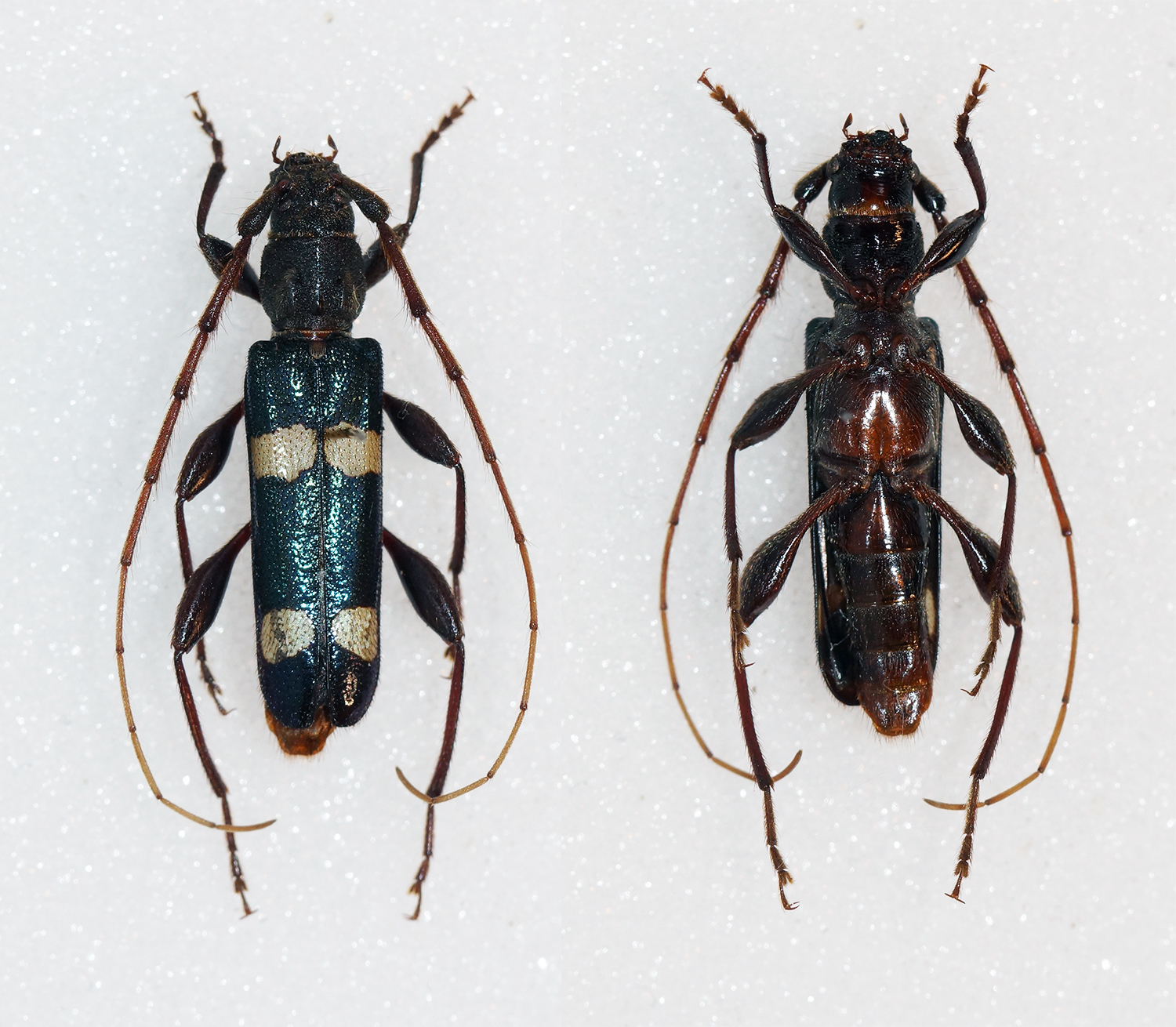
- Maripanus quadrimaculatus

Scientific classification
- Kingdom: Animalia
- Phylum: Arthropoda
- Class: Insecta
- Order: Coleoptera
- Suborder: Polyphaga
- Infraorder: Cucujiformia
- Family: Cerambycidae
- Tribe: Compsocerini
- Genus: Maripanus; Germain, 1898
- Species: M. quadrimaculatus

Binomial name
- Maripanus quadrimaculatus (Germain, 1892)

= Maripanus =

Genus of beetles

Maripanus is a genus in the longhorn beetle family Cerambycidae. This genus has a single species, Maripanus quadrimaculatus, found in Argentina and Chile.
