= Compsocerus bicoloricornis =

Scientific classification
- Domain: Eukaryota
- Kingdom: Animalia
- Phylum: Arthropoda
- Class: Insecta
- Order: Coleoptera
- Suborder: Polyphaga
- Infraorder: Cucujiformia
- Family: Cerambycidae
- Genus: Compsocerus
- Species: C. bicoloricornis

Binomial name
- Compsocerus bicoloricornis Schwarzer, 1923

Species of beetle

Compsocerus bicoloricornis is a species of beetle in the family Cerambycidae. It was described by Schwarzer in 1923.
