= Compsopyris =

Scientific classification
- Domain: Eukaryota
- Kingdom: Animalia
- Phylum: Arthropoda
- Class: Insecta
- Order: Coleoptera
- Suborder: Polyphaga
- Infraorder: Cucujiformia
- Family: Cerambycidae
- Tribe: Compsocerini
- Genus: Compsopyris; Dalens, Touroult & Tavakilian, 2010
- Species: C. pereurae

Binomial name
- Compsopyris pereurae Dalens, Touroult & Tavakilian, 2010

Genus of beetles

Compsopyris is a genus in the longhorn beetle family Cerambycidae. This genus has a single species, Compsopyris pereurae, found in French Guiana.
