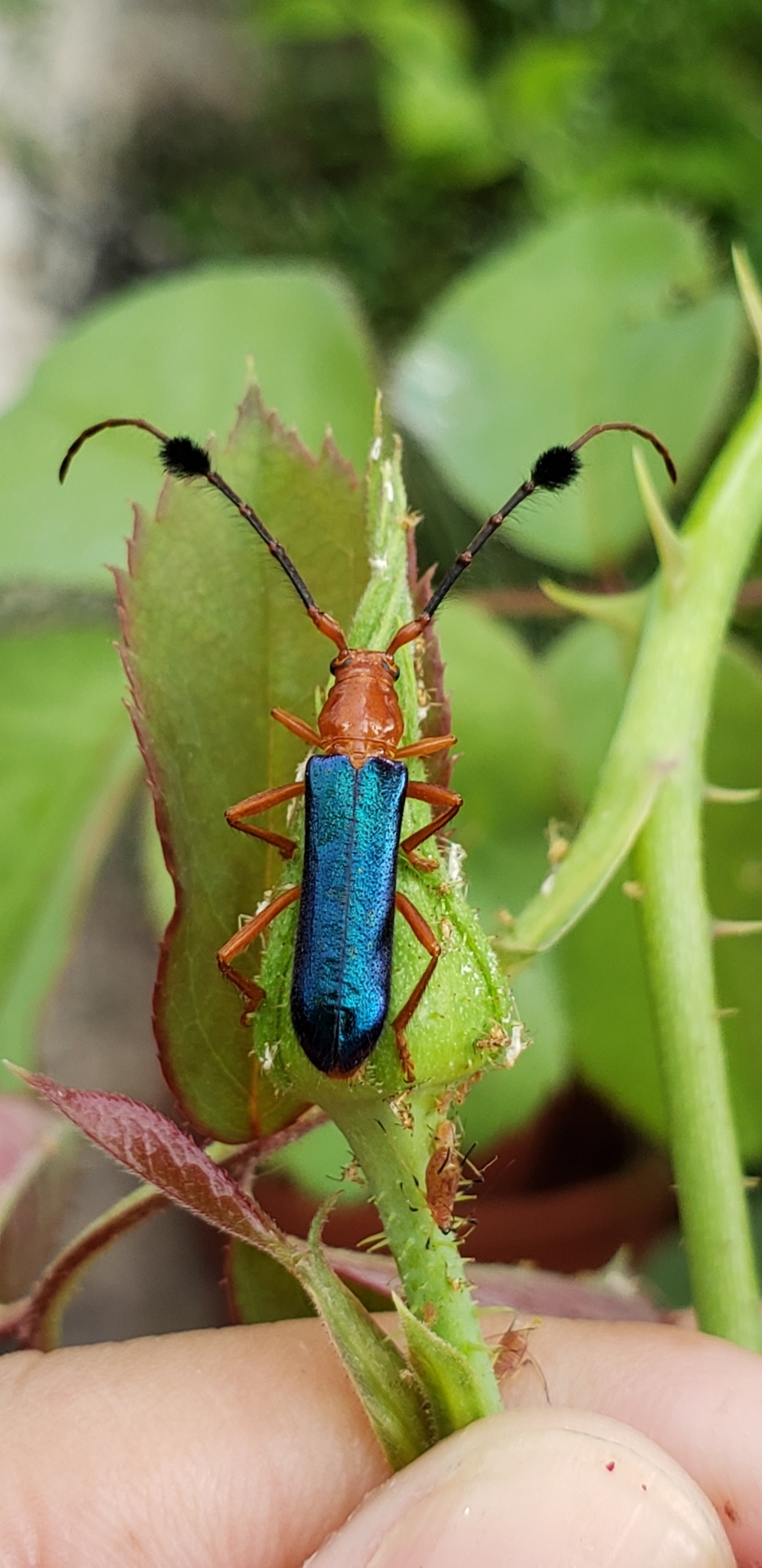
- Compsocerus parviscopus, Argentina

Scientific classification
- Kingdom: Animalia
- Phylum: Arthropoda
- Class: Insecta
- Order: Coleoptera
- Suborder: Polyphaga
- Infraorder: Cucujiformia
- Family: Cerambycidae
- Genus: Compsocerus
- Species: C. parviscopus

Binomial name
- Compsocerus parviscopus (Burmeister, 1865)

Synonyms
- Compsocerus vicinus Júlio, Giorgi & Monné, 2000; Euryprosopus parviscopus Gemminger & Harold, 1872; Orthostoma parviscopa Burmeister, 1865; Orthostoma parviscopus Bruch, 1908

= Compsocerus parviscopus =

Species of beetle

Compsocerus parviscopus is a species of beetle in the beetle family Cerambycidae. It is found in Argentina.
