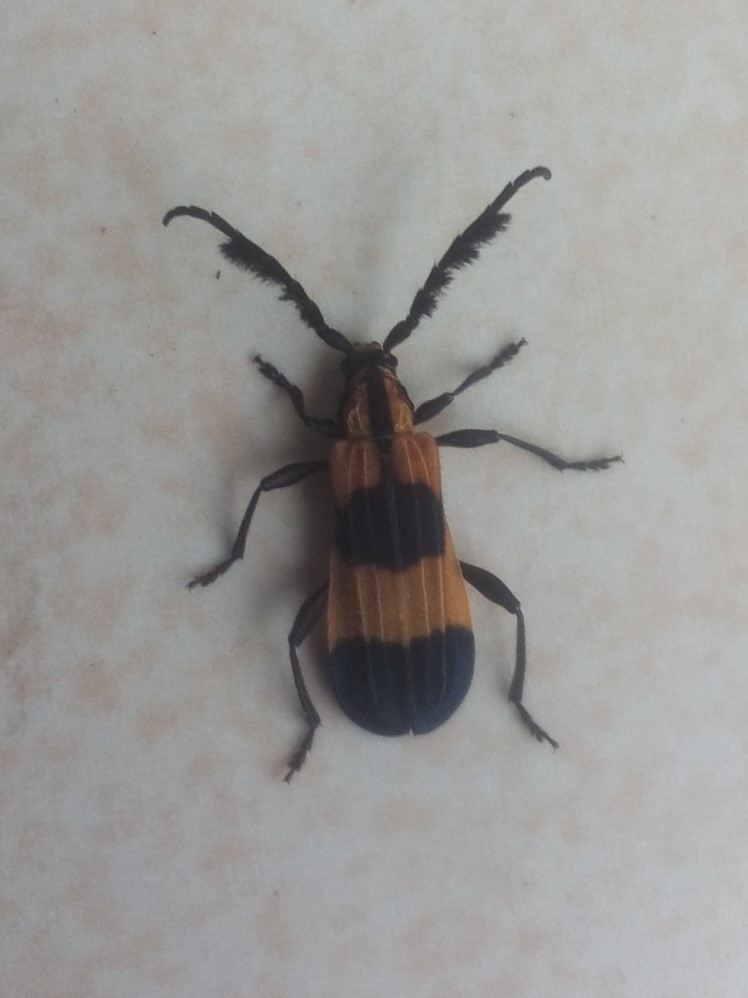

Scientific classification
- Domain: Eukaryota
- Kingdom: Animalia
- Phylum: Arthropoda
- Class: Insecta
- Order: Coleoptera
- Suborder: Polyphaga
- Infraorder: Cucujiformia
- Family: Cerambycidae
- Genus: Pteroplatus
- Species: P. quadriscopulatus

Binomial name
- Pteroplatus quadriscopulatus Bates, 1880

= Pteroplatus quadriscopulatus =

Species of beetle

Pteroplatus quadriscopulatus is a species of beetle in the family Cerambycidae. It was described by Henry Walter Bates in 1880.
