= Caperonotus =

Scientific classification
- Kingdom: Animalia
- Phylum: Arthropoda
- Class: Insecta
- Order: Coleoptera
- Suborder: Polyphaga
- Infraorder: Cucujiformia
- Family: Cerambycidae
- Subfamily: Cerambycinae
- Tribe: Compsocerini
- Genus: Caperonotus; Napp, 1993

Genus of beetles

Caperonotus is a genus of typical longhorn beetles in the family Cerambycidae. There are at least four described species in Caperonotus, found in Brazil, Peru, and French Guiana.

== Species ==
These four species belong to the genus Caperonotus:

- Caperonotus cardinalis (Bates, 1870) (Brazil and Peru)
- Caperonotus guianensis Dalens & Touroult, 2009 (French Guiana)
- Caperonotus superbus (Aurivillius, 1897) (Brazil and Peru)
- Caperonotus tucurui Napp & Monné, 2008 (Brazil)
