= Protuberonotum =

Scientific classification
- Domain: Eukaryota
- Kingdom: Animalia
- Phylum: Arthropoda
- Class: Insecta
- Order: Coleoptera
- Suborder: Polyphaga
- Infraorder: Cucujiformia
- Family: Cerambycidae
- Tribe: Compsocerini
- Genus: Protuberonotum; Barriga & Cepeda, 2004
- Species: P. roitmani

Binomial name
- Protuberonotum roitmani Barriga & Cepeda, 2004

Genus of beetles

Protuberonotum is a genus of Long-Horned Beetles in the beetle family Cerambycidae. This genus has a single species, Protuberonotum roitmani, found in Chile.
