= Pteroplatus suturalis =

Scientific classification
- Domain: Eukaryota
- Kingdom: Animalia
- Phylum: Arthropoda
- Class: Insecta
- Order: Coleoptera
- Suborder: Polyphaga
- Infraorder: Cucujiformia
- Family: Cerambycidae
- Genus: Pteroplatus
- Species: P. suturalis

Binomial name
- Pteroplatus suturalis Buquet, 1840

Species of beetle

Pteroplatus suturalis is a species of beetle in the family Cerambycidae. It was described by Buquet in 1840.
