= Cosmoplatus =

Scientific classification
- Kingdom: Animalia
- Phylum: Arthropoda
- Class: Insecta
- Order: Coleoptera
- Suborder: Polyphaga
- Infraorder: Cucujiformia
- Family: Cerambycidae
- Tribe: Compsocerini
- Genus: Cosmoplatus; Aurivillius, 1891

Genus of beetles

Cosmoplatus is a genus of beetles in the family Cerambycidae, containing the following species:

- Cosmoplatus brasilianus Zajciw, 1963
- Cosmoplatus peruvianus Aurivillius, 1891
- Cosmoplatus polis Hernandez, Santos-Silva & Nascimento, 2019
