= Pteroplatus transversalis =

Scientific classification
- Domain: Eukaryota
- Kingdom: Animalia
- Phylum: Arthropoda
- Class: Insecta
- Order: Coleoptera
- Suborder: Polyphaga
- Infraorder: Cucujiformia
- Family: Cerambycidae
- Genus: Pteroplatus
- Species: P. transversalis

Binomial name
- Pteroplatus transversalis Breme, 1844

Species of beetle

Pteroplatus transversalis is a species of beetle in the family Cerambycidae. It was described by Breme in 1844.
