= Deltosoma guatemalense =

Scientific classification
- Kingdom: Animalia
- Phylum: Arthropoda
- Class: Insecta
- Order: Coleoptera
- Suborder: Polyphaga
- Infraorder: Cucujiformia
- Family: Cerambycidae
- Genus: Deltosoma
- Species: D. guatemalense

Binomial name
- Deltosoma guatemalense Bates, 1880

Species of beetle

Deltosoma guatemalense is a species of beetle in the family Cerambycidae. It was described by Bates in 1880.
