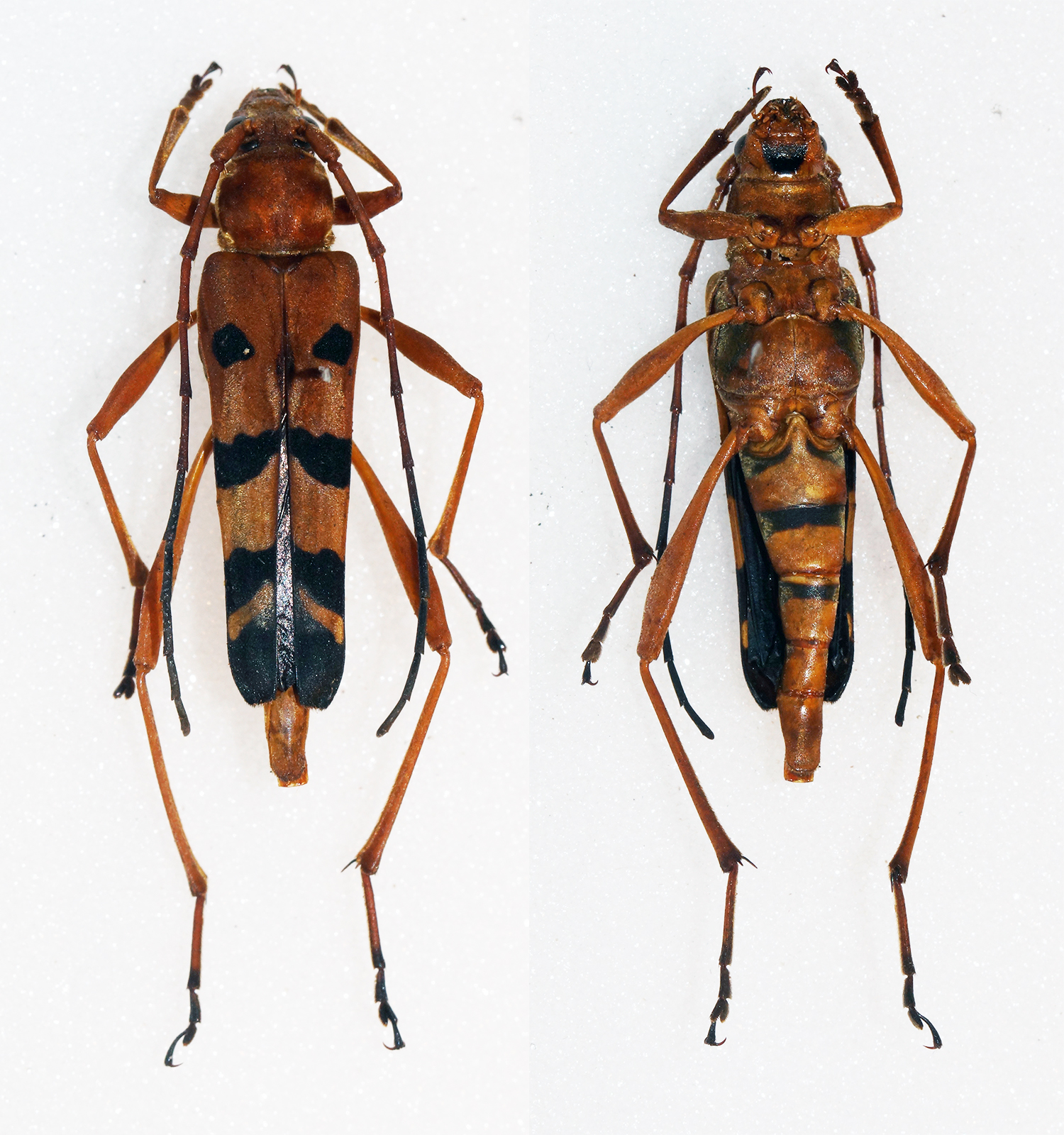

Scientific classification
- Kingdom: Animalia
- Phylum: Arthropoda
- Class: Insecta
- Order: Coleoptera
- Suborder: Polyphaga
- Infraorder: Cucujiformia
- Family: Cerambycidae
- Genus: Acrocyrtidus
- Species: A. argenteofasciatus

Binomial name
- Acrocyrtidus argenteofasciatus (Pic, 1903)

Synonyms
- Mausaridaeus argenteofasciatus Pic, 1903

= Acrocyrtidus argenteofasciatus =

Species of beetle

Acrocyrtidus argenteofasciatus is a species of beetle in the family Cerambycidae. It is found in Asian countries including Vietnam.
