= Cosmoplatus brasilianus =

Scientific classification
- Kingdom: Animalia
- Phylum: Arthropoda
- Class: Insecta
- Order: Coleoptera
- Suborder: Polyphaga
- Infraorder: Cucujiformia
- Family: Cerambycidae
- Genus: Cosmoplatus
- Species: C. brasilianus

Binomial name
- Cosmoplatus brasilianus Zajciw, 1963

Species of beetle

Cosmoplatus brasilianus is a species of beetle in the family Cerambycidae. It was described by Zajciw in 1963.
