= Chlorethe =

Scientific classification
- Domain: Eukaryota
- Kingdom: Animalia
- Phylum: Arthropoda
- Class: Insecta
- Order: Coleoptera
- Suborder: Polyphaga
- Infraorder: Cucujiformia
- Family: Cerambycidae
- Subfamily: Cerambycinae
- Tribe: Compsocerini
- Genus: Chlorethe; Bates, 1867

Synonyms
- Chimoreia Lane, 1956

Genus of beetles

Chlorethe is a genus in the longhorn beetle family Cerambycidae. There are at least four described species in Chlorethe, found in South America.

== Species ==
These four species belong to the genus Chlorethe:

- Chlorethe brachyptera Zajciw, 1963 (Brazil)
- Chlorethe ingae Bates, 1867 (Bolivia, Brazil, Ecuador, French Guiana, and Peru)
- Chlorethe lalannecassoui Dalens, Tavakilian & Touroult, 2010 (French Guiana)
- Chlorethe scabrosa Zajciw, 1963 (Argentina and Brazil)
