= Aglaoschema violaceipenne =

Scientific classification
- Kingdom: Animalia
- Phylum: Arthropoda
- Class: Insecta
- Order: Coleoptera
- Suborder: Polyphaga
- Infraorder: Cucujiformia
- Family: Cerambycidae
- Genus: Aglaoschema
- Species: A. violaceipenne

Binomial name
- Aglaoschema violaceipenne (Aurivillius, 1897)

Species of beetle

Aglaoschema violaceipenne is a species of beetle in the family Cerambycidae. It was described by Per Olof Christopher Aurivillius in 1897.
