= Aglaoschema quieci =

Scientific classification
- Kingdom: Animalia
- Phylum: Arthropoda
- Class: Insecta
- Order: Coleoptera
- Suborder: Polyphaga
- Infraorder: Cucujiformia
- Family: Cerambycidae
- Genus: Aglaoschema
- Species: A. quieci

Binomial name
- Aglaoschema quieci Dalens, Tavakilian, & Touroult, 2010

Species of beetle

Aglaoschema quieci is a species of beetle in the family Cerambycidae. It was described by Dalens, Tavakilian, and Touroult in 2010.
