= Thelgetra latipennis =

Scientific classification
- Kingdom: Animalia
- Phylum: Arthropoda
- Class: Insecta
- Order: Coleoptera
- Suborder: Polyphaga
- Infraorder: Cucujiformia
- Family: Cerambycidae
- Genus: Thelgetra
- Species: T. latipennis

Binomial name
- Thelgetra latipennis Thomson, 1864

Species of beetle

Thelgetra latipennis is a species of beetle in the family Cerambycidae. It was described by Thomson in 1864.
