= Corynellus lampyrimorphus =

Scientific classification
- Kingdom: Animalia
- Phylum: Arthropoda
- Class: Insecta
- Order: Coleoptera
- Suborder: Polyphaga
- Infraorder: Cucujiformia
- Family: Cerambycidae
- Genus: Corynellus
- Species: C. lampyrimorphus

Binomial name
- Corynellus lampyrimorphus Swift, 2008

Species of beetle

Corynellus lampyrimorphus is a species of beetle in the family Cerambycidae. It was described by Swift in 2008.
