= Chaetosopus =

Scientific classification
- Kingdom: Animalia
- Phylum: Arthropoda
- Class: Insecta
- Order: Coleoptera
- Suborder: Polyphaga
- Infraorder: Cucujiformia
- Family: Cerambycidae
- Subfamily: Cerambycinae
- Tribe: Compsocerini
- Genus: Chaetosopus; Napp & Martins, 1988

Genus of beetles

Chaetosopus is a genus in the longhorn beetle family Cerambycidae. There are at least three described species in Chaetosopus, found in Brazil.

== Species ==
These three species belong to the genus Chaetosopus:

- Chaetosopus contiguus Napp & Martins, 1988
- Chaetosopus infalsatus Napp & Martins, 1988
- Chaetosopus violaceus (Martins, 1973)
