= Aglaoschema dulce =

Scientific classification
- Kingdom: Animalia
- Phylum: Arthropoda
- Class: Insecta
- Order: Coleoptera
- Suborder: Polyphaga
- Infraorder: Cucujiformia
- Family: Cerambycidae
- Genus: Aglaoschema
- Species: A. dulce

Binomial name
- Aglaoschema dulce (Napp & Martins, 1988)

Species of beetle

Aglaoschema dulce is a species of beetle in the family Cerambycidae. It was described by Napp and Martins in 1988.
