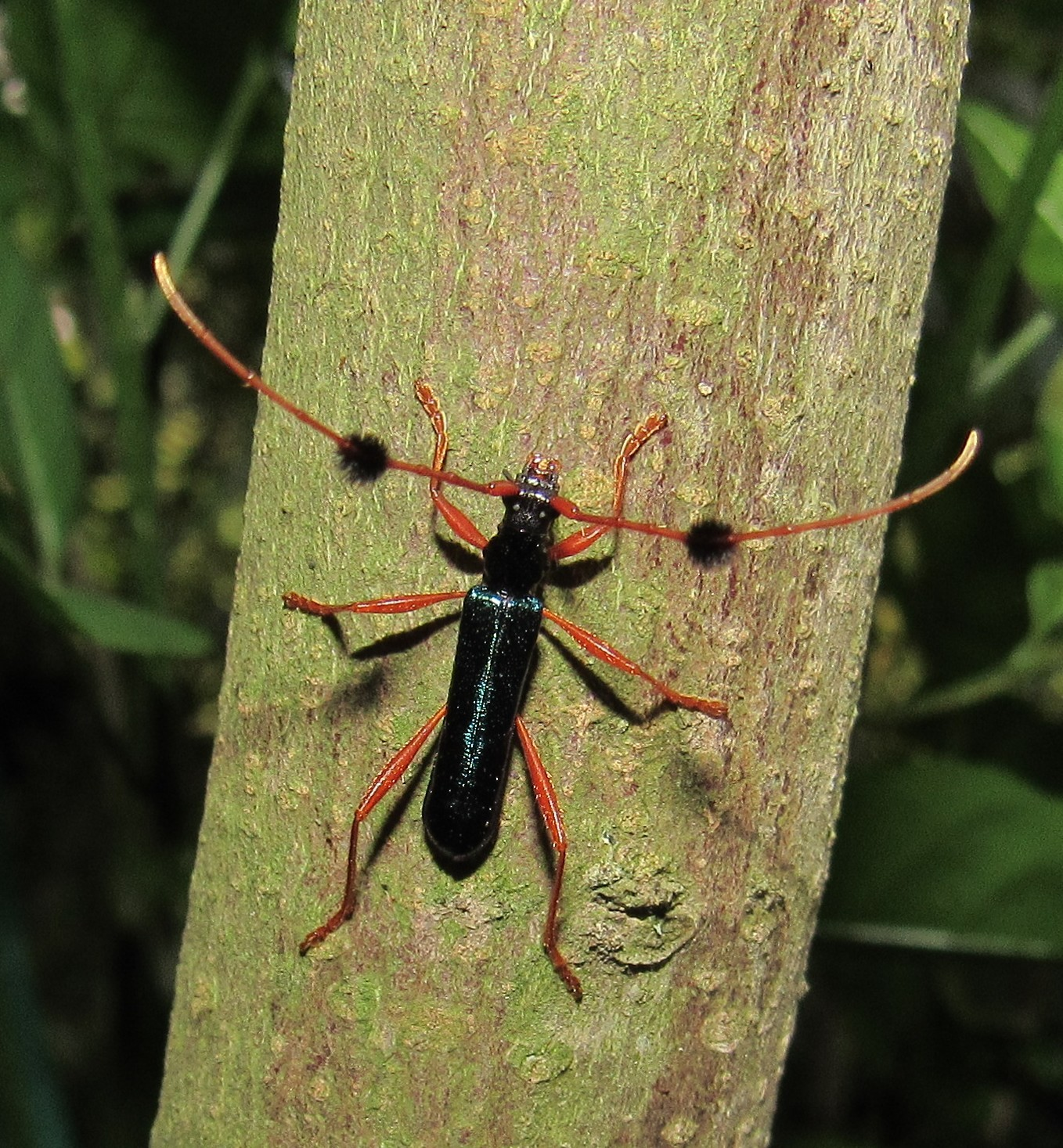
- Compsocerus chevrolati, Brazil

Scientific classification
- Domain: Eukaryota
- Kingdom: Animalia
- Phylum: Arthropoda
- Class: Insecta
- Order: Coleoptera
- Suborder: Polyphaga
- Infraorder: Cucujiformia
- Family: Cerambycidae
- Subfamily: Cerambycinae
- Tribe: Compsocerini
- Genus: Compsocerus; Audinet-Serville, 1834

Synonyms
- Compsocera; Orthostomidius Bruch, 1908

= Compsocerus =

Genus of beetles

Compsocerus is a genus of typical longhorn beetles in the family Cerambycidae. There are about seven described species in Compsocerus, found in South America.

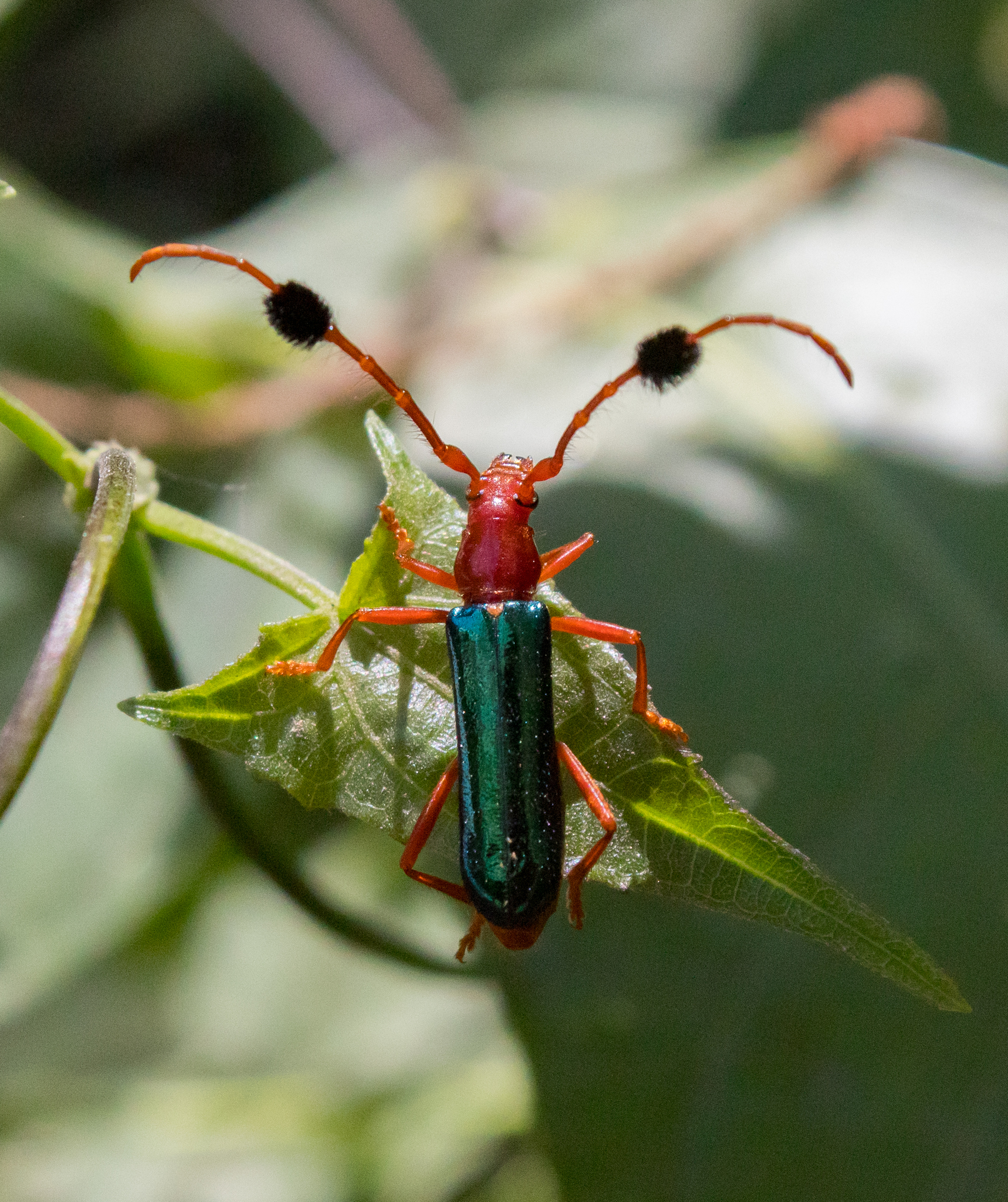
Compsocerus violaceus, Brazil

== Species ==
These seven species belong to the genus Compsocerus:

- Compsocerus barbicornis Audinet-Serville, 1834 (Brazil)
- Compsocerus bicoloricornis Schwarzer, 1923 (Brazil)
- Compsocerus chevrolati Gounelle, 1910 (Brazil)
- Compsocerus deceptor Napp, 1976 (Brazil)
- Compsocerus parviscopus (Burmeister, 1865) (Argentina)
- Compsocerus proximus Napp, 1977 (Argentina, Bolivia, and Brazil)
- Compsocerus violaceus (White, 1853) (Uruguay, Argentina, Bolivia, Brazil, and Paraguay)
