= Cosmoplatus polis =

Scientific classification
- Kingdom: Animalia
- Phylum: Arthropoda
- Class: Insecta
- Order: Coleoptera
- Suborder: Polyphaga
- Infraorder: Cucujiformia
- Family: Cerambycidae
- Genus: Cosmoplatus
- Species: C. polis

Binomial name
- Cosmoplatus polis Hernandez, Santos-Silva & Nascimento, 2019

Species of longhorn beetle

Cosmoplatus polis is a recently discovered species of beetle in the family Cerambycidae. It was described by Juan José Ramírez Hernández, Antonio Santos-Silva, and Francisco E. De L. Nascimento in 2019. The species is named after the village where it was first collected, San Juan de Polis, Loreto, Peru.
