= Thelgetra =

Scientific classification
- Kingdom: Animalia
- Phylum: Arthropoda
- Class: Insecta
- Order: Coleoptera
- Suborder: Polyphaga
- Infraorder: Cucujiformia
- Family: Cerambycidae
- Tribe: Pteroplatini
- Genus: Thelgetra

Genus of beetles

Thelgetra is a genus of beetles in the family Cerambycidae, containing the following species:

- Thelgetra adusta (Burmeister, 1865)
- Thelgetra latipennis Thomson, 1864
