= Upindauara =

Scientific classification
- Kingdom: Animalia
- Phylum: Arthropoda
- Class: Insecta
- Order: Coleoptera
- Suborder: Polyphaga
- Infraorder: Cucujiformia
- Family: Cerambycidae
- Tribe: Compsocerini
- Genus: Upindauara; Napp & Martins, 2006
- Species: U. bella

Binomial name
- Upindauara bella Napp & Martins, 2006

Genus of beetles

Upindauara is a genus of Long-Horned Beetles in the beetle family Cerambycidae. This genus has a single species, Upindauara bella, found in Brazil.
