= Corynellus =

Scientific classification
- Kingdom: Animalia
- Phylum: Arthropoda
- Class: Insecta
- Order: Coleoptera
- Suborder: Polyphaga
- Infraorder: Cucujiformia
- Family: Cerambycidae
- Subfamily: Cerambycinae
- Tribe: Pteroplatini
- Genus: Corynellus; Bates, 1885

Genus of beetles

Corynellus is a genus of beetles in the family Cerambycidae, containing the following species:

- Corynellus aureus Linsley, 1961
- Corynellus cinnabarinus Chemsak & Linsley, 1979
- Corynellus lampyrimorphus Swift, 2008
- Corynellus mimulus Bates, 1885
- Corynellus ochraceus Bates, 1885
