= Aglaoschema =

Scientific classification
- Domain: Eukaryota
- Kingdom: Animalia
- Phylum: Arthropoda
- Class: Insecta
- Order: Coleoptera
- Suborder: Polyphaga
- Infraorder: Cucujiformia
- Family: Cerambycidae
- Tribe: Compsocerini
- Genus: Aglaoschema

Genus of beetles

Aglaoschema is a genus of beetles in the family Cerambycidae, containing the following species:

- Aglaoschema acauna (Napp, 2008)
- Aglaoschema albicorne (Fabricius, 1801)
- Aglaoschema apixara (Napp, 2007)
- Aglaoschema basale (Melzer, 1933)
- Aglaoschema camusi (Dalens, Tavakilian, & Touroult, 2010)
- Aglaoschema collorata (Napp, 1993)
- Aglaoschema concolor (Gounelle, 1911)
- Aglaoschema cyaneum (Pascoe, 1860)
- Aglaoschema dulce (Napp & Martins, 1988)
- Aglaoschema erythrocephala (Napp & Martins, 1988)
- Aglaoschema geoffroyi (Dalens, Tavakilian, & Touroult, 2010)
- Aglaoschema haemorrhoidale (Germar, 1824)
- Aglaoschema inca (Napp, 2007)
- Aglaoschema mimos (Napp, 2008)
- Aglaoschema mourei (Napp, 1993)
- Aglaoschema potiguassu (Napp, 2008)
- Aglaoschema prasinipenne (Lucas, 1857)
- Aglaoschema prasiniventre (Gounelle, 1911)
- Aglaoschema quieci (Dalens, Tavakilian, & Touroult, 2010)
- Aglaoschema rondoniense (Napp, 2008)
- Aglaoschema ruficeps (Bates, 1870)
- Aglaoschema rufiventre (Germar, 1824)
- Aglaoschema tarnieri (Bates, 1870)
- Aglaoschema ventrale (Germar, 1824)
- Aglaoschema vinolenta (Dalens, Tavakilian, & Touroult, 2010)
- Aglaoschema violaceipenne (Aurivillius, 1897)
- Aglaoschema viridipenne (Thomson, 1860)
