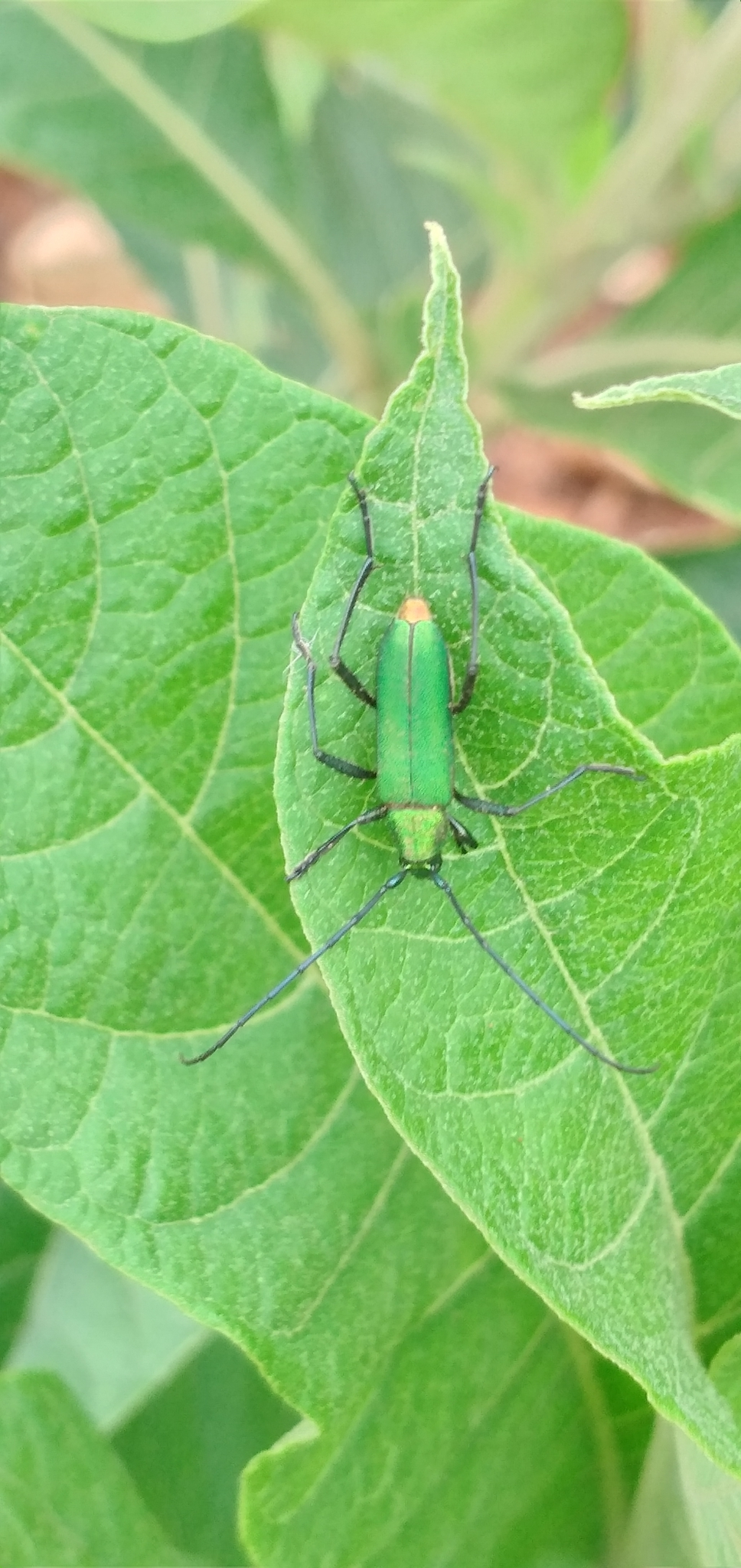
- Orthostoma abdominale, Brazil

Scientific classification
- Kingdom: Animalia
- Phylum: Arthropoda
- Class: Insecta
- Order: Coleoptera
- Suborder: Polyphaga
- Infraorder: Cucujiformia
- Family: Cerambycidae
- Subfamily: Cerambycinae
- Tribe: Compsocerini
- Genus: Orthostoma; Lacordaire, 1830

= Orthostoma =

Genus of beetles

Orthostoma is a genus in the longhorn beetle family Cerambycidae. There are at least three described species in Orthostoma, found in South America.

== Species ==
These three species belong to the genus Orthostoma:

- Orthostoma abdominale (Gyllenhal, 1817) (Bolivia, Brazil, Colombia, Ecuador, Paraguay, and Peru)
- Orthostoma chryseis (Bates, 1870) (Brazil, French Guiana, and Surinam)
- Orthostoma vittata (Aurivillius, 1910) (Venezuela)
