= Aglaoschema viridipenne =

Scientific classification
- Kingdom: Animalia
- Phylum: Arthropoda
- Class: Insecta
- Order: Coleoptera
- Suborder: Polyphaga
- Infraorder: Cucujiformia
- Family: Cerambycidae
- Genus: Aglaoschema
- Species: A. viridipenne

Binomial name
- Aglaoschema viridipenne Thomson, 1860

Species of beetle

Aglaoschema viridipenne is a species of beetle in the family Cerambycidae. It was described by Thomson in 1860.
