= Aglaoschema apixara =

Scientific classification
- Kingdom: Animalia
- Phylum: Arthropoda
- Class: Insecta
- Order: Coleoptera
- Suborder: Polyphaga
- Infraorder: Cucujiformia
- Family: Cerambycidae
- Genus: Aglaoschema
- Species: A. apixara

Binomial name
- Aglaoschema apixara Napp, 2007

Species of beetle

Aglaoschema apixara is a species of beetle in the family Cerambycidae. It was described by Napp in 2007.
