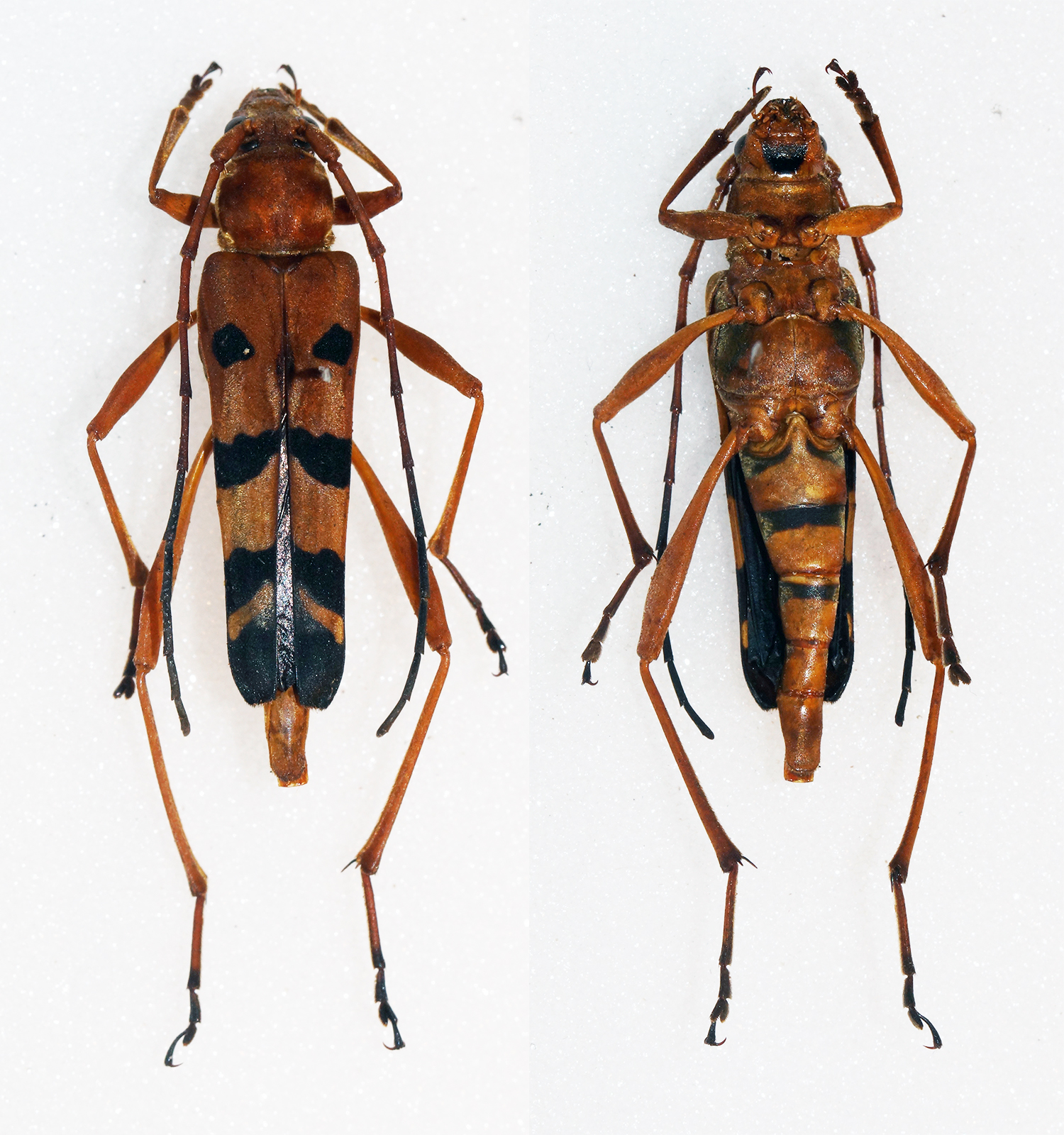
- Acrocyrtidus argenteofasciatus

Scientific classification
- Kingdom: Animalia
- Phylum: Arthropoda
- Class: Insecta
- Order: Coleoptera
- Suborder: Polyphaga
- Infraorder: Cucujiformia
- Family: Cerambycidae
- Tribe: Compsocerini
- Genus: Acrocyrtidus; Jordan, 1894

Species
- See text

= Acrocyrtidus =

Genus of beetles

Acrocyrtidus is a genus of beetles in the family Cerambycidae.

== Species ==
The following species are accepted within Acrocyrtidus:

- Acrocyrtidus argenteofasciatus (Pic, 1903)
- Acrocyrtidus argenteus Gressitt & Rondon, 1970
- Acrocyrtidus attenuatus (Pic, 1927)
- Acrocyrtidus aurescens Gressitt & Rondon, 1970
- Acrocyrtidus auricomus Holzschuh, 1982
- Acrocyrtidus avarus Holzschuh, 1989
- Acrocyrtidus bentanachsi Viktora & Liu, 2018
- Acrocyrtidus diversinotatus (Pic, 1903)
- Acrocyrtidus elegantulus (Matsushita, 1933)
  - Acrocyrtidus elegantulus longicornis Hayashi, 1962
- Acrocyrtidus fasciatus Jordan, 1894
- Acrocyrtidus fulvus Gressitt & Rondon, 1970
- Acrocyrtidus griseofasciatus Hayashi, 1982
- Acrocyrtidus jianfeng Viktora & Liu, 2018
- Acrocyrtidus jirouxi Viktora & Liu, 2018
- Acrocyrtidus longipes (Matsushita, 1941)
- Acrocyrtidus simianshanensis Chiang & Chen, 1994
  - Acrocyrtidus simianshanensis reductus Holzschuh, 2010
