= Pteroplatus anchora =

Scientific classification
- Domain: Eukaryota
- Kingdom: Animalia
- Phylum: Arthropoda
- Class: Insecta
- Order: Coleoptera
- Suborder: Polyphaga
- Infraorder: Cucujiformia
- Family: Cerambycidae
- Genus: Pteroplatus
- Species: P. anchora

Binomial name
- Pteroplatus anchora Belon, 1903

Species of beetle

Pteroplatus anchora is a species of beetle in the family Cerambycidae. It was described by Belon in 1903.
