= Mimochariergus =

Scientific classification
- Domain: Eukaryota
- Kingdom: Animalia
- Phylum: Arthropoda
- Class: Insecta
- Order: Coleoptera
- Suborder: Polyphaga
- Infraorder: Cucujiformia
- Family: Cerambycidae
- Subfamily: Cerambycinae
- Tribe: Compsocerini
- Genus: Mimochariergus; Zajciw, 1960

Genus of beetles

Mimochariergus is a genus in the longhorn beetle family Cerambycidae. There are at least two described species in Mimochariergus, found in South America.

== Species ==
These two species belong to the genus Mimochariergus:

- Mimochariergus carbonelli Zajciw, 1960 (Argentina, Brazil, Paraguay, and Uruguay)
- Mimochariergus fluminensis Napp & Mermudes, 1999 (Brazil)
