= Aglaoschema concolor =

Scientific classification
- Kingdom: Animalia
- Phylum: Arthropoda
- Class: Insecta
- Order: Coleoptera
- Suborder: Polyphaga
- Infraorder: Cucujiformia
- Family: Cerambycidae
- Genus: Aglaoschema
- Species: A. concolor

Binomial name
- Aglaoschema concolor (Gounelle, 1911)

Species of beetle

Aglaoschema concolor is a species of beetle in the family Cerambycidae. It was described by Gounelle in 1911.
