= Ecoporanga (beetle) =

Scientific classification
- Kingdom: Animalia
- Phylum: Arthropoda
- Class: Insecta
- Order: Coleoptera
- Suborder: Polyphaga
- Infraorder: Cucujiformia
- Family: Cerambycidae
- Subfamily: Cerambycinae
- Tribe: Compsocerini
- Genus: Ecoporanga; Napp & Martins, 2006

Genus of beetles

Ecoporanga is a genus of typical longhorn beetles in the family Cerambycidae. There are at least three described species in Ecoporanga, found in South America.

== Species ==
These three species belong to the genus Ecoporanga:

- Ecoporanga achira Napp & Martins, 2006 (Bolivia)
- Ecoporanga cooperi Monné M. L. & Monné M. A., 2014 (Peru)
- Ecoporanga wallacei Monné M. L. & Monné M. A., 2014 (Ecuador)
