= Cosmoplatus peruvianus =

Scientific classification
- Kingdom: Animalia
- Phylum: Arthropoda
- Class: Insecta
- Order: Coleoptera
- Suborder: Polyphaga
- Infraorder: Cucujiformia
- Family: Cerambycidae
- Genus: Cosmoplatus
- Species: C. peruvianus

Binomial name
- Cosmoplatus peruvianus Aurivillius, 1891

Species of beetle

Cosmoplatus peruvianus is a species of beetle in the family Cerambycidae. It was described by Per Olof Christopher Aurivillius in 1891.
