= Thelgetra adusta =

Scientific classification
- Kingdom: Animalia
- Phylum: Arthropoda
- Clade: Pancrustacea
- Class: Insecta
- Order: Coleoptera
- Suborder: Polyphaga
- Infraorder: Cucujiformia
- Family: Cerambycidae
- Genus: Thelgetra
- Species: T. adusta

Binomial name
- Thelgetra adusta (Burmeister, 1865)

Species of beetle

Thelgetra adusta is a species of beetle in the family Cerambycidae. It was described by Hermann Burmeister in 1865. It is found in Brazil (Mato Grosso do Sul, São Paulo, Paraná, Santa Catarina, Rio Grande do Sul), Bolivia (Cochabamba), Paraguay, Argentina (Tucumán, Santiago del Estero, Santa Fé) and Uruguay.
