= Aglaoschema albicorne =

Scientific classification
- Kingdom: Animalia
- Phylum: Arthropoda
- Class: Insecta
- Order: Coleoptera
- Suborder: Polyphaga
- Infraorder: Cucujiformia
- Family: Cerambycidae
- Genus: Aglaoschema
- Species: A. albicorne

Binomial name
- Aglaoschema albicorne (Fabricius, 1801)

Species of beetle

Aglaoschema albicorne is a species of beetle in the family Cerambycidae. It was described by Johan Christian Fabricius in 1801.
