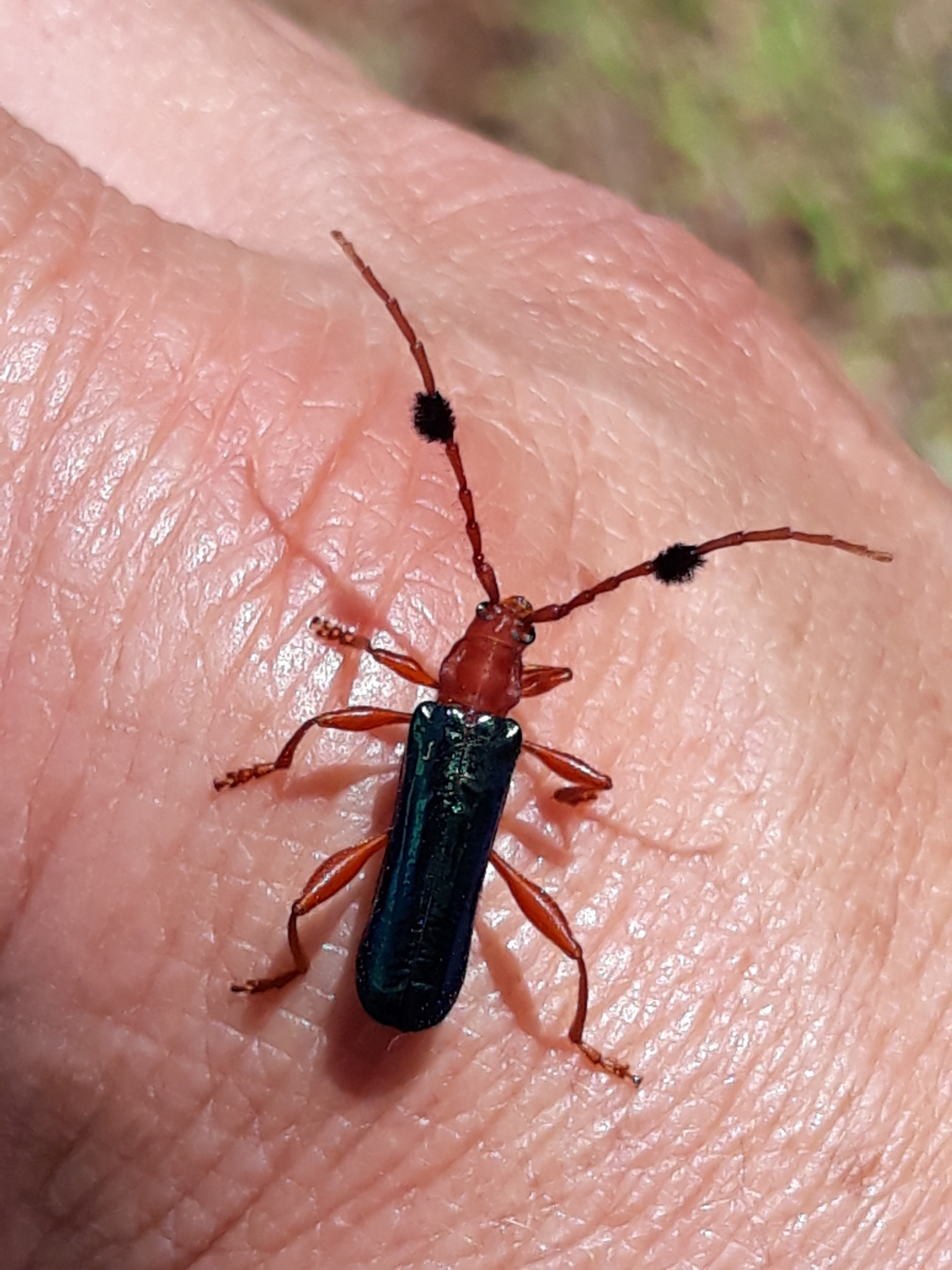
- Compsoceridius gounellei, Brazil

Scientific classification
- Domain: Eukaryota
- Kingdom: Animalia
- Phylum: Arthropoda
- Class: Insecta
- Order: Coleoptera
- Suborder: Polyphaga
- Infraorder: Cucujiformia
- Family: Cerambycidae
- Tribe: Compsocerini
- Genus: Compsoceridius; Bruch, 1908
- Species: C. gounellei

Binomial name
- Compsoceridius gounellei (Bruch, 1908)

= Compsoceridius =

Genus of beetles

Compsoceridius is a genus in the longhorn beetle family Cerambycidae. This genus has a single species, Compsoceridius gounellei, found in Uruguay, Paraguay, Brazil, and Argentina.
