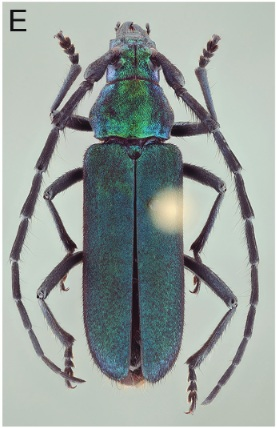

Scientific classification
- Kingdom: Animalia
- Phylum: Arthropoda
- Clade: Pancrustacea
- Class: Insecta
- Order: Coleoptera
- Suborder: Polyphaga
- Infraorder: Cucujiformia
- Family: Cerambycidae
- Genus: Aglaoschema
- Species: A. ventrale

Binomial name
- Aglaoschema ventrale (Germar, 1824)

Synonyms
- Callichroma ventrale Germar, 1823

= Aglaoschema ventrale =

Species of beetle

Aglaoschema ventrale is a species of beetle in the family Cerambycidae. It was described by Ernst Friedrich Germar in 1824. It is found in Bolivia, Brazil, Paraguay, Argentina and possibly Peru.
