= Hylorus =

Scientific classification
- Domain: Eukaryota
- Kingdom: Animalia
- Phylum: Arthropoda
- Class: Insecta
- Order: Coleoptera
- Suborder: Polyphaga
- Infraorder: Cucujiformia
- Family: Cerambycidae
- Tribe: Compsocerini
- Genus: Hylorus; Thomson, 1864
- Species: H. armatus

Binomial name
- Hylorus armatus (Chabrillac, 1857)

Genus of beetles

Hylorus is a genus of Long-Horned Beetles in the beetle family Cerambycidae. This genus has a single species, Hylorus armatus. It is found in Brazil.
