= Aglaoschema potiguassu =

Scientific classification
- Kingdom: Animalia
- Phylum: Arthropoda
- Class: Insecta
- Order: Coleoptera
- Suborder: Polyphaga
- Infraorder: Cucujiformia
- Family: Cerambycidae
- Genus: Aglaoschema
- Species: A. potiguassu

Binomial name
- Aglaoschema potiguassu Napp, 2008

Species of beetle

Aglaoschema potiguassu is a species of beetle in the family Cerambycidae. It was described by Napp in 2008.
