= Corynellus aureus =

Scientific classification
- Kingdom: Animalia
- Phylum: Arthropoda
- Class: Insecta
- Order: Coleoptera
- Suborder: Polyphaga
- Infraorder: Cucujiformia
- Family: Cerambycidae
- Genus: Corynellus
- Species: C. aureus

Binomial name
- Corynellus aureus Linsley, 1961

Species of beetle

Corynellus aureus is a species of beetle in the family Cerambycidae. It was described by Linsley in 1961.
