= Deltosoma =

Scientific classification
- Kingdom: Animalia
- Phylum: Arthropoda
- Class: Insecta
- Order: Coleoptera
- Suborder: Polyphaga
- Infraorder: Cucujiformia
- Family: Cerambycidae
- Subfamily: Cerambycinae
- Tribe: Pteroplatini
- Genus: Deltosoma; Thomson, 1864

Genus of beetles

Deltosoma is a genus of beetles in the family Cerambycidae, containing the following species:

- Deltosoma flavidum Aurivillius, 1925
- Deltosoma guatemalense Bates, 1880
- Deltosoma lacordairei Thomson, 1864
- Deltosoma xerophila Di Iorio, 1995
