= Caperonotus superbus =

Scientific classification
- Kingdom: Animalia
- Phylum: Arthropoda
- Class: Insecta
- Order: Coleoptera
- Suborder: Polyphaga
- Infraorder: Cucujiformia
- Family: Cerambycidae
- Genus: Caperonotus
- Species: C. superbus

Binomial name
- Caperonotus superbus (Aurivillius, 1897)

Synonyms
- Caperonotus superbum Demez & Touroult, 2011; Orthoschema superba Blackwelder, 1946; Orthoschema superbum Aurivillius, 1912; Orthostoma superbum Monné, 1993

Species of beetle

Caperonotus superbus is a species of beetle in the beetle family Cerambycidae. It is found in Brazil and Peru.

This species was described by Per Olof Christopher Aurivillius in 1897.
