= Dilocerus =

Scientific classification
- Domain: Eukaryota
- Kingdom: Animalia
- Phylum: Arthropoda
- Class: Insecta
- Order: Coleoptera
- Suborder: Polyphaga
- Infraorder: Cucujiformia
- Family: Cerambycidae
- Subfamily: Cerambycinae
- Tribe: Compsocerini
- Genus: Dilocerus; Napp, 1980

Genus of beetles

Dilocerus is a genus in the longhorn beetle family Cerambycidae. There are at least two described species in Dilocerus, found in Bolivia and Argentina.

== Species ==
These two species belong to the genus Dilocerus:

- Dilocerus brunneus Napp & Martins, 2006 (Bolivia)
- Dilocerus marinonii Napp, 1980 (Argentina and Bolivia)
