= Acabyara =

Scientific classification
- Domain: Eukaryota
- Kingdom: Animalia
- Phylum: Arthropoda
- Class: Insecta
- Order: Coleoptera
- Suborder: Polyphaga
- Infraorder: Cucujiformia
- Family: Cerambycidae
- Genus: Acabyara; Napp & Martins, 2006
- Species: A. aruama

Binomial name
- Acabyara aruama Napp & Martins, 2006

Genus of beetles

Acabyara aruama is a species of beetle in the family Cerambycidae, the only species in the genus Acabyara.
