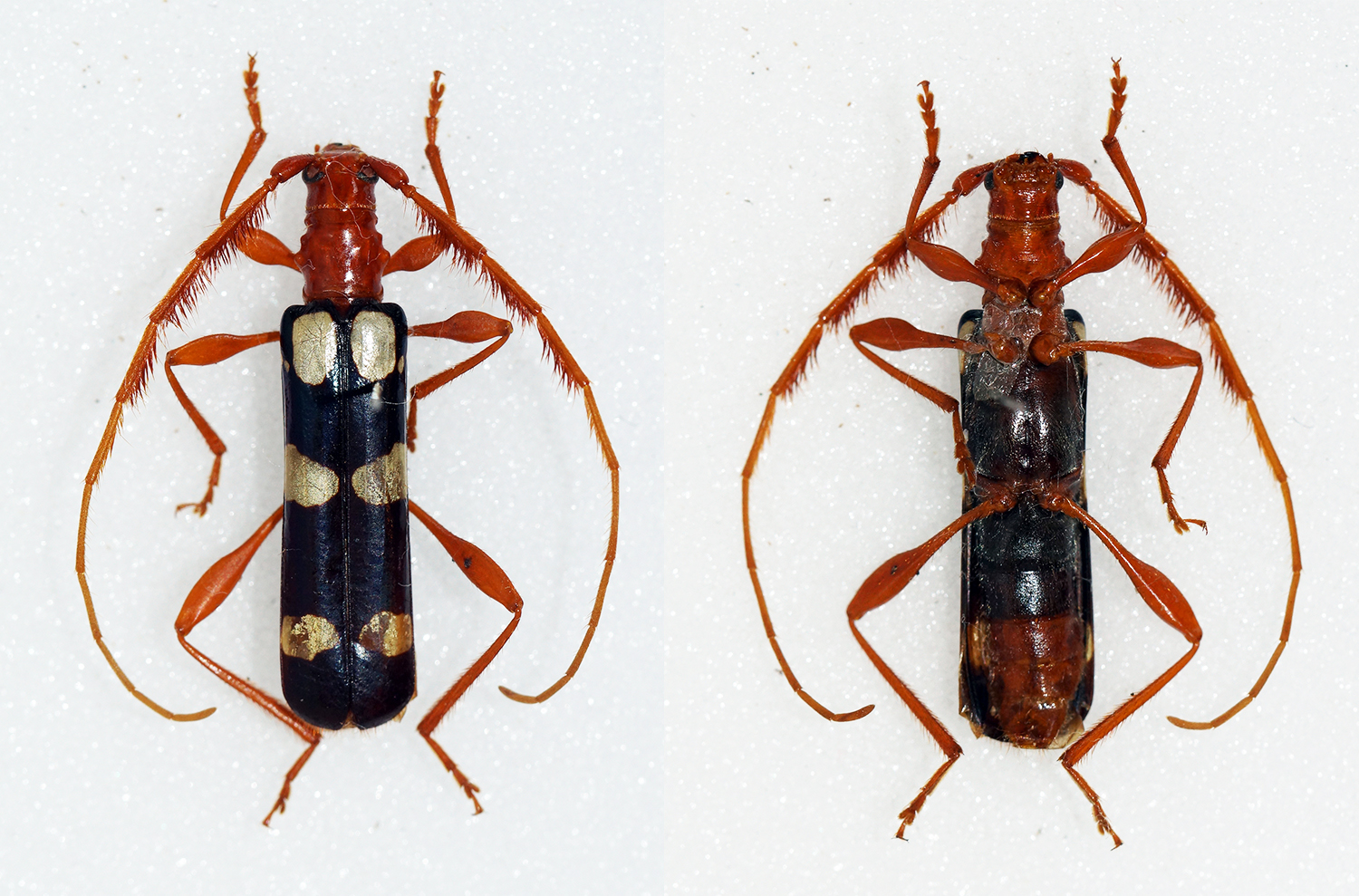

Scientific classification
- Kingdom: Animalia
- Phylum: Arthropoda
- Clade: Pancrustacea
- Class: Insecta
- Order: Coleoptera
- Suborder: Polyphaga
- Infraorder: Cucujiformia
- Family: Cerambycidae
- Genus: Achenoderus
- Species: A. octomaculatus

Binomial name
- Achenoderus octomaculatus (Fairmaire & Germain, 1861)

= Achenoderus =

Genus of beetles

Achenoderus octomaculatus is a species of beetle in the family Cerambycidae, the only species in the genus Achenoderus.
