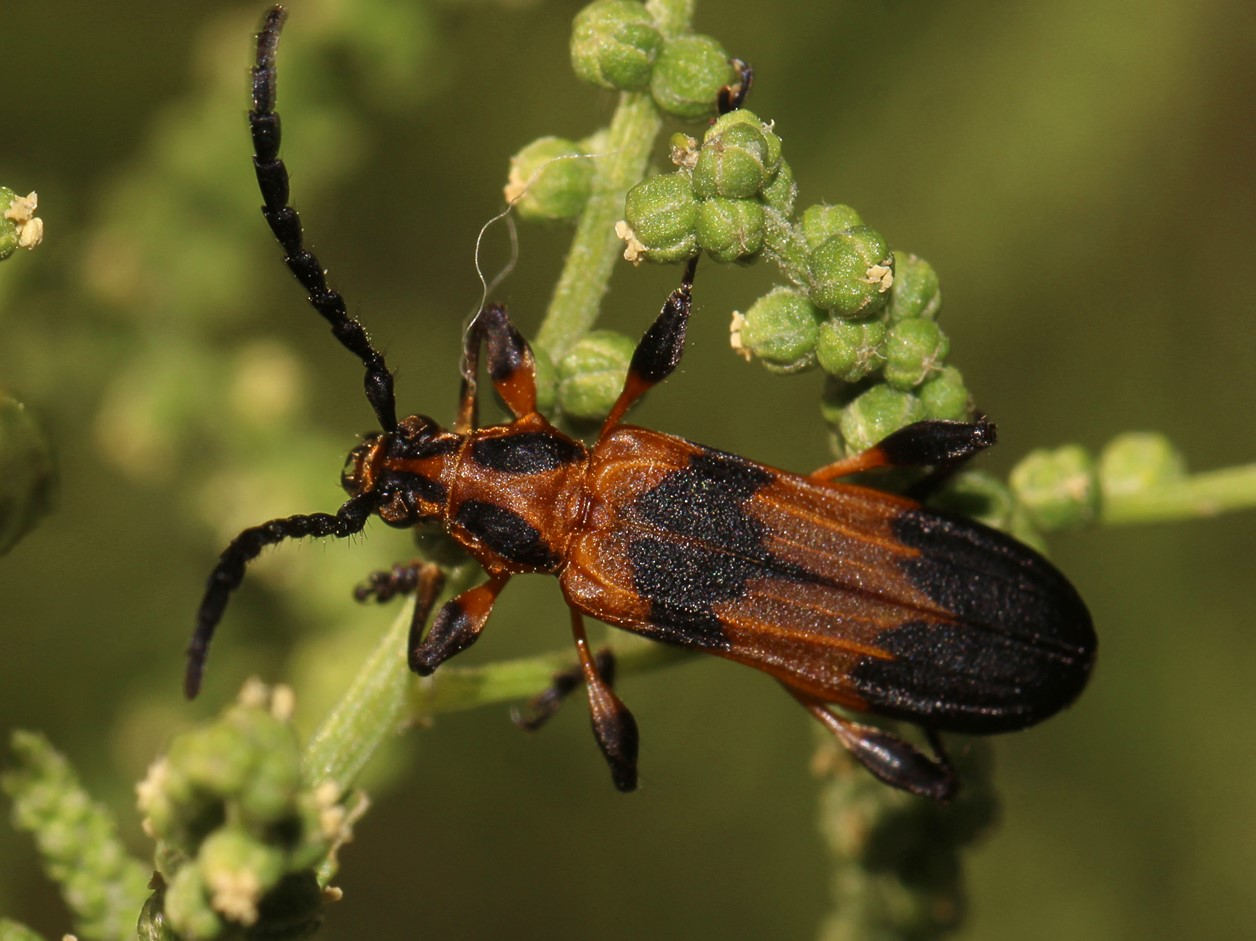

Scientific classification
- Domain: Eukaryota
- Kingdom: Animalia
- Phylum: Arthropoda
- Class: Insecta
- Order: Coleoptera
- Suborder: Polyphaga
- Infraorder: Cucujiformia
- Family: Cerambycidae
- Genus: Aphylax (Germar, 1824)
- Species: A. lyciformis

Binomial name
- Aphylax lyciformis (Germar, 1824)

= Aphylax =

Aphylax lyciformis

Genus of beetles

Aphylax is a genus of beetles in the family Cerambycidae. It is monotypic, being represented by the single species Aphylax lyciformis.
