= Nubosoplatus =

Nubosoplatus inbio

Scientific classification
- Kingdom: Animalia
- Phylum: Arthropoda
- Class: Insecta
- Order: Coleoptera
- Suborder: Polyphaga
- Infraorder: Cucujiformia
- Family: Cerambycidae
- Genus: Nubosoplatus
- Species: N. inbio

Binomial name
- Nubosoplatus inbio Swift, 2008

Genus of beetles

Nubosoplatus inbio is a species of beetle in the family Cerambycidae, the only species in the genus Nubosoplatus.
