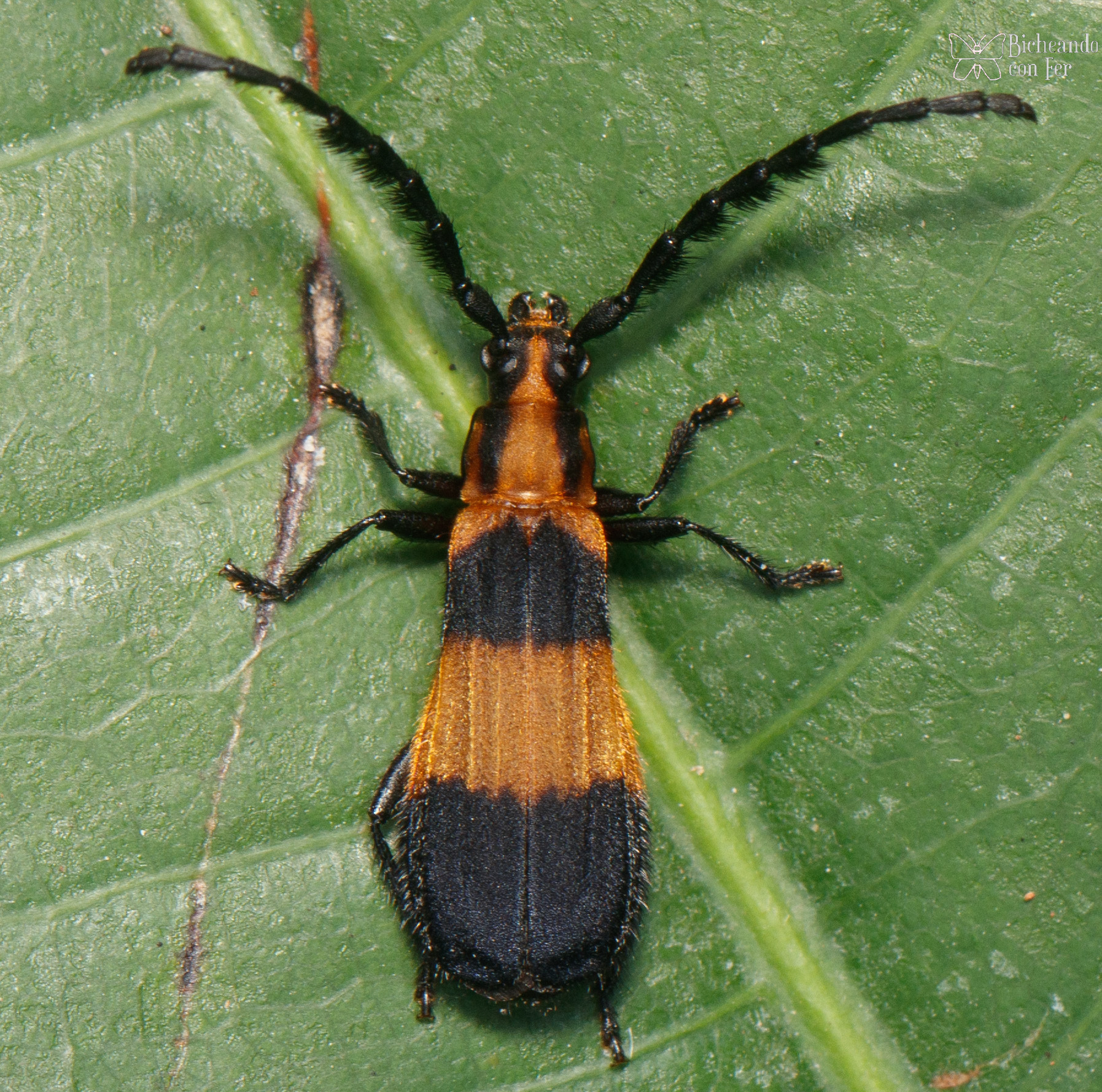
- Cosmoplatidius bilineatus, México

Scientific classification
- Domain: Eukaryota
- Kingdom: Animalia
- Phylum: Arthropoda
- Class: Insecta
- Order: Coleoptera
- Suborder: Polyphaga
- Infraorder: Cucujiformia
- Family: Cerambycidae
- Subfamily: Cerambycinae
- Tribe: Compsocerini
- Genus: Cosmoplatidius; Gounelle, 1911

= Cosmoplatidius =

Genus of beetles

Cosmoplatidius is a genus in the longhorn beetle family Cerambycidae. There are about five described species in Cosmoplatidius, found in Central and South America.

== Species ==
These five species belong to the genus Cosmoplatidius:

- Cosmoplatidius abare Napp & Martins, 2006 (Bolivia, Brazil, and Peru)
- Cosmoplatidius bilineatus (Buquet, 1841) (Central America, Colombia, Trinidad and Tobago)
- Cosmoplatidius lycoides (Guérin-Méneville, 1844) (Brazil, French Guiana, Bolivia, and Guyana)
- Cosmoplatidius simulans (Bates, 1870) (Ecuador, French Guiana, Brazil, Bolivia, and Peru)
