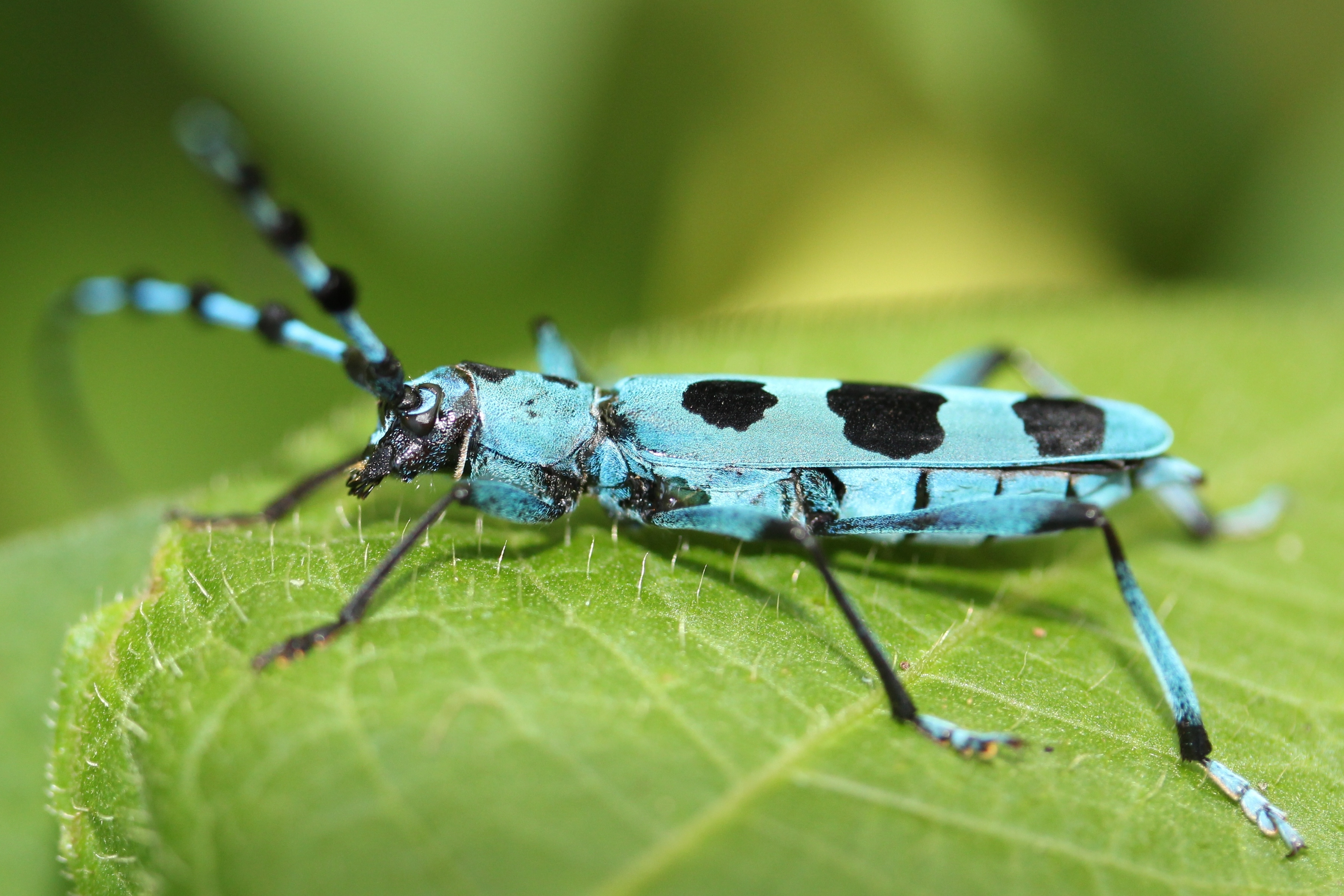
- Rosalia batesi

Scientific classification
- Domain: Eukaryota
- Kingdom: Animalia
- Phylum: Arthropoda
- Class: Insecta
- Order: Coleoptera
- Suborder: Polyphaga
- Infraorder: Cucujiformia
- Family: Cerambycidae
- Subfamily: Cerambycinae
- Tribe: Compsocerini; Thomson, 1864

Synonyms
- Compsocérides Thomson, 1864; Compsocerinae Thomson, 1864; Compsoceritae Thomson, 1864; Rosaliina Fairmaire, 1864; Rosaliini Fairmaire, 1864; Rosaliites Fairmaire, 1864

= Compsocerini =

Tribe of beetles

Compsocerini is a tribe of beetles in the subfamily Cerambycinae, containing the following genera:

== Genera ==
These 33 genera belong to the tribe Compsocerini:

Acabyara Napp & Martins, 2006
Achenoderus Napp, 1979
Acoremia Kolbe, 1893
Acrocyrtidus Jordan, 1894
Aglaoschema Napp, 1994
Callichromopsis Chevrolat, 1863
Caperonotus Napp, 1993
Chaetosopus Napp & Martins, 1988
Chlorethe Bates, 1867
Compsoceridius Bruch, 1908
Compsocerus Lacordaire, 1830
Compsopyris Dalens, Touroult & Tavakilian, 2010
Cosmisomopsis Zajciw, 1960
Cosmoplatidius Gounelle, 1911
Dilocerus Napp, 1980
Ecoporanga Napp & Martins, 2006
Eduardiella Holzschuh, 1993
Eurybatus Thomson, 1861
Evgenius Fåhraeus, 1872
Goatacara Napp & Martins, 2006
Holosphaga Aurivillius, 1916
Hylorus Thomson, 1864
Luteicenus Pic, 1922
Maripanus Germain, 1898
Mimochariergus Zajciw, 1960
Orthostoma Lacordaire, 1830
Paramombasius Fuchs, 1966
Platycyrtidus Vives & Niisato, 2011
Protuberonotum Barriga & Cepeda, 2004
Pseudocallidium Plavilstshikov, 1934
Rosalia Audinet-Serville, 1833
Upindauara Napp & Martins, 2006
Villiersocerus Lepesme, 1950
