= Mesquite =

Several species of leguminous trees

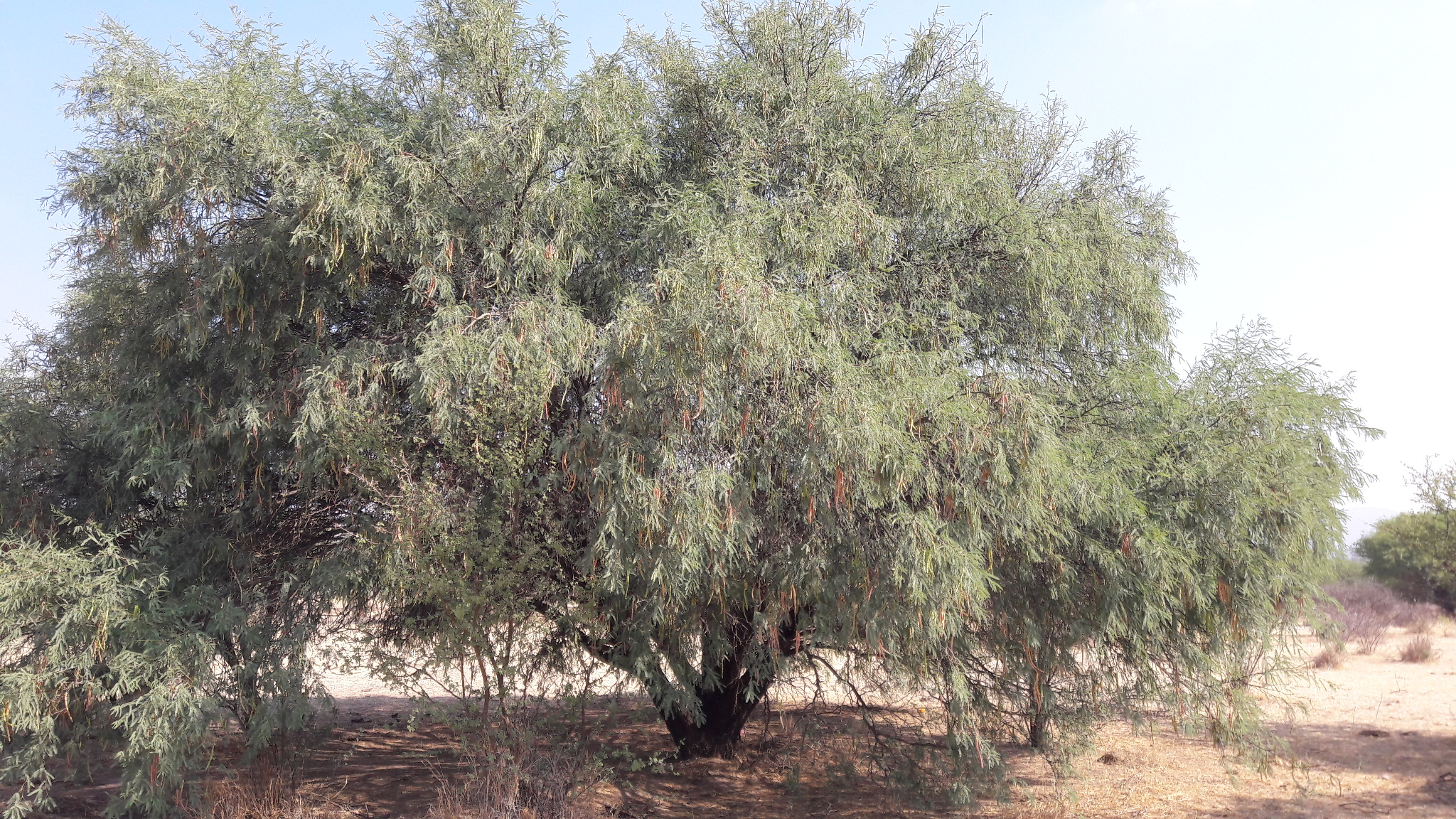
Neltuma laevigata mesquite near the Chichimeco dam, in Jesús María, Aguascalientes, Mexico

Mesquite (also spelled mezquit and mezquite) is a common name for some plants in the genera Neltuma and Strombocarpa, which contain over 50 species of spiny, deep-rooted leguminous shrubs and small trees. They are native to dry areas in the Americas. Until 2022, these genera were traditionally included in a broad view of the genus Prosopis, but that genus is now restricted to a few species native to the Old World.

Mesquites have extremely long taproots to seek water from very far under ground, making them extremely drought-tolerant. As they are legumes, mesquites are one of the few sources of fixed nitrogen in the desert habitat. Their fruits, known as "mesquite pods", are dry and often sweet, edible for humans and livestock, and served as a staple food for indigenous peoples in the deserts of North America.

== History ==
Mesquites have been in North America since the Pliocene era and their wood has been dated to 3300 BPY. They are thought to have evolved with extinct megafauna, which ate their fruit and dispersed their seeds. With the arrival of cattle to the New World, mesquites gained a new seed disperser and were able to increase in abundance. Another theory is that mesquites had always been present in grasslands, but recurring fires had delayed plant and seed development before the emergence of livestock and grazing.

== Etymology ==
The English word mesquite is borrowed from the Mexican Spanish word mezquite, which in turn was borrowed from the Nāhuatl term mizquitl.

== Habitat ==
Mesquites grow as a small shrub in shallow soil or as tall as 15 metres (49 ft) in deep soil with adequate moisture, and form a canopy often wider than tall. Many species often have multiple trunks. They have bipinnate leaflets of a light green to blue hue that cast a light to deep shade, depending on the species. Spikes of flowers form in spring and summer that form a flat pod of beans 5–15 centimetres (2–6 in) long. Most species form thorns. When cut to the ground, the tree can often recover.

== Human uses ==
The pods of most mesquite species are edible. Once the pod is dry, the whole pod can be ground into flour and made into bread. The Cahuilla and Tohono O'odham indigenous peoples of western North America were known to use mesquite as a staple food.

Mesquite wood was a popular type of wood used by early Spaniards to build ships, but is now used most commonly for high-end rustic furniture and cabinets. Scraps and small pieces are used commonly as wood for cooking with smoke in the United States.

Red-orange sap can be found on the branches of mesquite trees during the summer. This sap was used by those who lived in the desert for several medicinal treatments. The sap was used as a salve and spread on burns and cuts to speed up the healing process. Gargling a mixture of water and sap was used to soothe sore throats, and the same mixture was said to be able to cure upset stomachs.

Some species are an important honey plant in their native range, producing a highly valued honey.

In the Southwest United States and Mexico, both native and South American species are planted as drought-tolerant shade trees. Thornless selections are often used.

In Calvinia, in the Northern Cape province of South Africa where the trees were once considered invasive, the mesquite pods are now being turned into coffee.

== As an introduced and invasive species ==
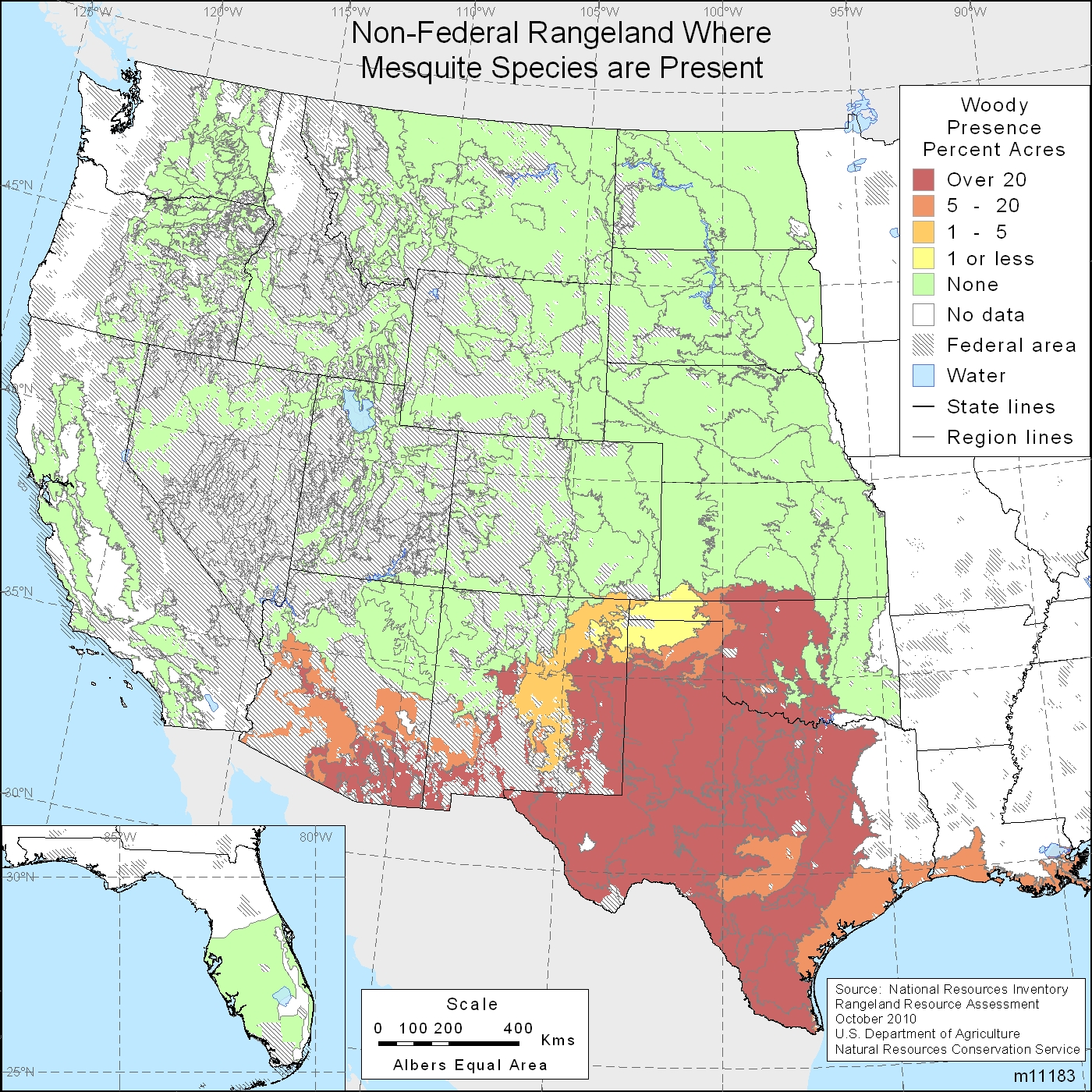
Nonfederal rangeland where aggressive, native mesquite species are present in the United States

Some species have become problematic invasive species in Africa, Asia, and Australia. Mesquites are also often regarded as "invasive" pests within their native range on rangelands of the Southwestern United States.

=== In its native range ===
In the United States, native mesquites have increased in abundance and become the dominant woody plant on 38,000,000 hectares (94,000,000 acres) of semiarid grasslands. Their recent success is mostly attributed to the introduction of domestic livestock, although other factors include climate change, overgrazing, and the reduction of fire frequency. Studies have shown that grass production increases following control of mesquite.

In Mexico and the US, the two most problematic species are Eastern honey mesquite (Neltuma glandulosa) and velvet mesquite (Neltuma velutina). Eastern honey mesquite is considered the most common and widely spread "pest" plant in Texas. An estimated 25% of Texas grasslands support mesquite and 16 million acres (6.5 million hectares) have dense stands reported to suppress the majority of grass production.

At lower densities (i.e. savannas or a scattered thickets), native mesquites have ecological and economic benefits such as enhanced soil fertility, shade and food for livestock, wildlife habitat, and serving as a nurse plant for other plant species.

=== As an introduced species ===
Honey and other mesquites have been introduced to parts of Africa, Asia, and Australia. Honey mesquite is considered by the World Conservation Union as one of the world's most problematic invasive species. In some cases, they have been able to successfully outcompete the native Prosopis species.

In Australia Neltuma spp. (N. pallida, N. glandulosa, N. velutina, and their hybrids with N. juliflora) are ranked nationally as one of the 20 most significant weeds. They now cover almost 1 million hectares (2.5 million acres) of land. Neltuma species were originally introduced to help with erosion because of their deep root systems.

Additionally N. laevigata was previously invasive in Australia, but has since been eradicated. The last known specimens of N. laevigata were eliminated in 2006, but given the possibility of lingering seeds in the soil seed bank, Biosecurity Queensland waited 15 years and declared Australia free of N. laevigata in 2021.

In India, mesquites had been introduced decades ago, but until recently, their effects had not been studied. This genus has been pushing out the Indian wild ass (Equus hemionus khur). This herbivorous mammal eats the pods of mesquites, which was one of the intended purposes of its introduction. Through digesting and excreting the seeds, the Indian wild asses are providing the habitat needed for germination. The 5,000 square kilometres (1,931 sq mi) Indian Wild Ass Sanctuary is experiencing mesquite invasion of roughly 1.95 square kilometres (0.75 sq mi) a year. By overtaking the land, the dense canopy cover of mesquite has made it so native vegetation cannot grow. It has also made watering holes inaccessible to the animals within this region. This lack of resources and range is forcing the endangered Indian wild ass into human landscapes and agriculture fields and locals are killing these asses to protect their crops.

=== Control strategies ===
Controlling mesquite is a challenging task. One often-used method is mechanical control. This can be effective with high mortality rates if stems are cut at least 20 centimetres (8 in) underground. Another method is through the application of herbicides, done on an individual plant basis. Basal application is effective to mesquite of all sizes, while foliar application is best for plants smaller than 1.5 metres (5 ft). Another physical option for control is through fires. Some species of mesquite are fire-sensitive, while others are fire-tolerant. For those that are fire-sensitive, this method can be highly effective, but those that are fire-tolerant require hot and intense fires to be effective. In Australia, scientists are trying biological control methods. They have introduced multiple insects, but the most effective in causing high population level impact is the leaf-tying moth (Evippe spp.). The most recommended method for managing mesquites, both in native and introduced ranges, is by targeting large numbers of plants either through herbicide or physical removal. Also, research is being done on using satellite and aerial images to assess canopy cover and determine which ranges should be targeted.

== Species ==
- Neltuma alba (white mesquite)
- Neltuma chilensis (Chilean mesquite)
- Neltuma glandulosa (Eastern honey mesquite)
- Neltuma humilis
- Neltuma juliflora
- Neltuma laevigata (smooth mesquite)
- Neltuma nigra (black mesquite)
- Neltuma odorata (Western honey mesquite)
- Neltuma pallida
- Neltuma velutina (velvet mesquite)
- Strombocarpa pubescens (screwbean mesquite, tornillo)
- Strombocarpa strombulifera (creeping mesquite)

The name 'mesquite' has also been applied to these Old World species, which were previously considered to share the genus Prosopis with the New World mesquites:

- Anonychium africanum (African "mesquite")
- Prosopis cineraria (Persian "mesquite")
- Prosopis farcta (Syrian "mesquite")

== Gallery ==
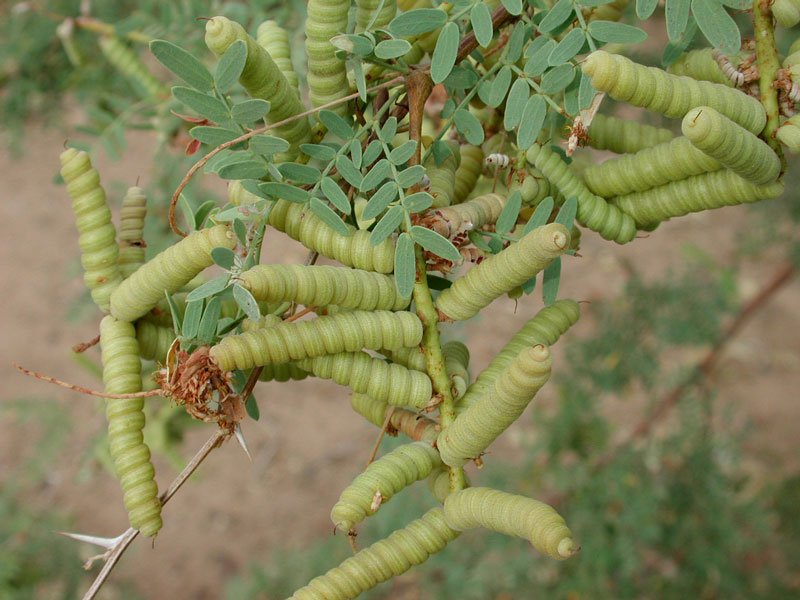
Screwbean mesquite pods

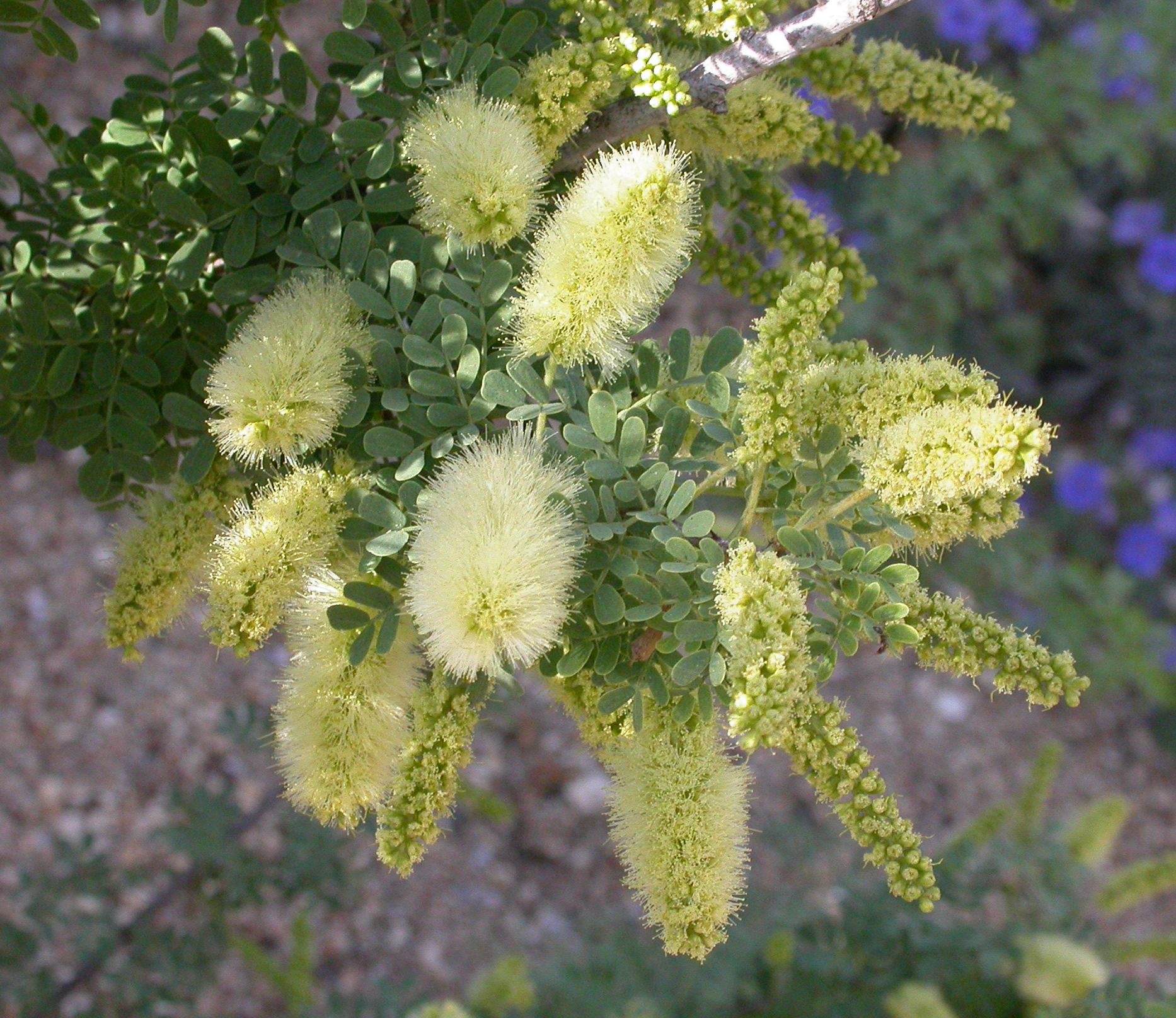
Screwbean mesquite flowers

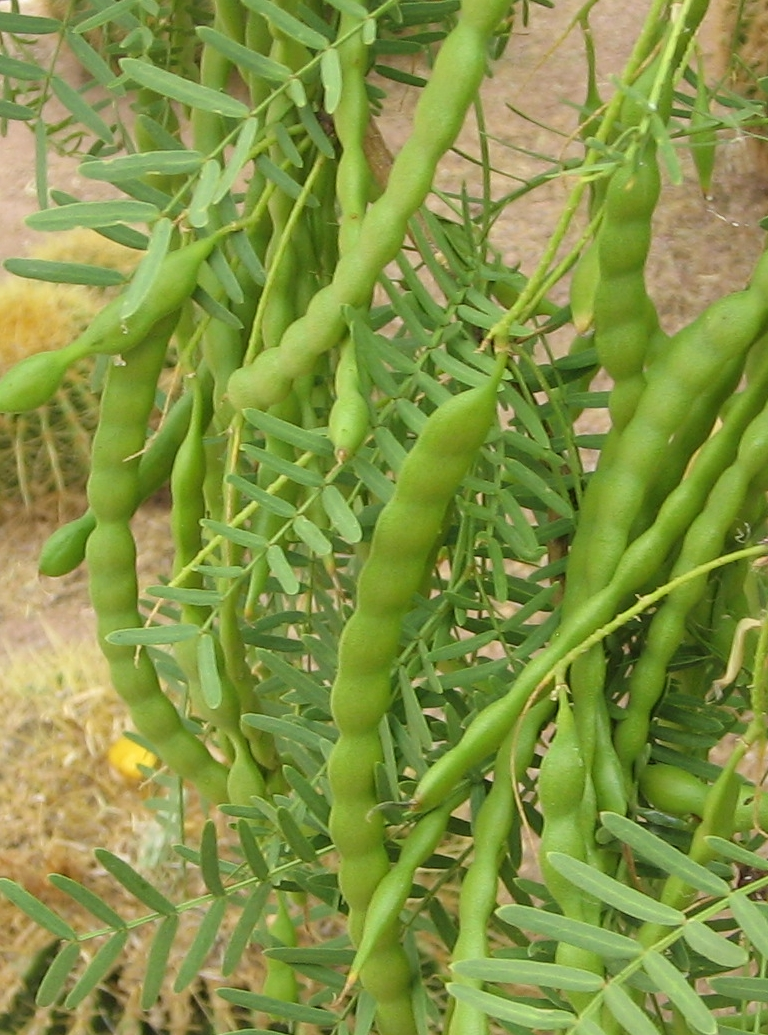
Honey mesquite, foliage with seedpods

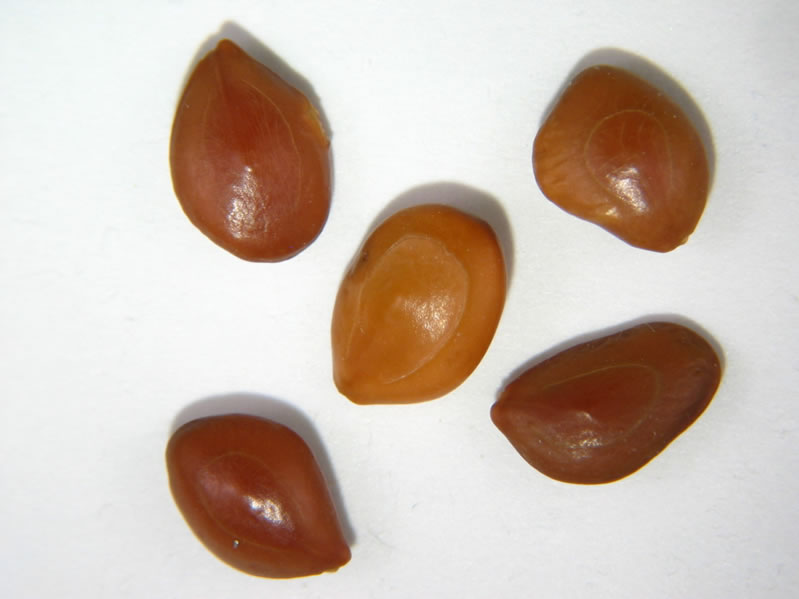
Velvet mesquite dried seeds

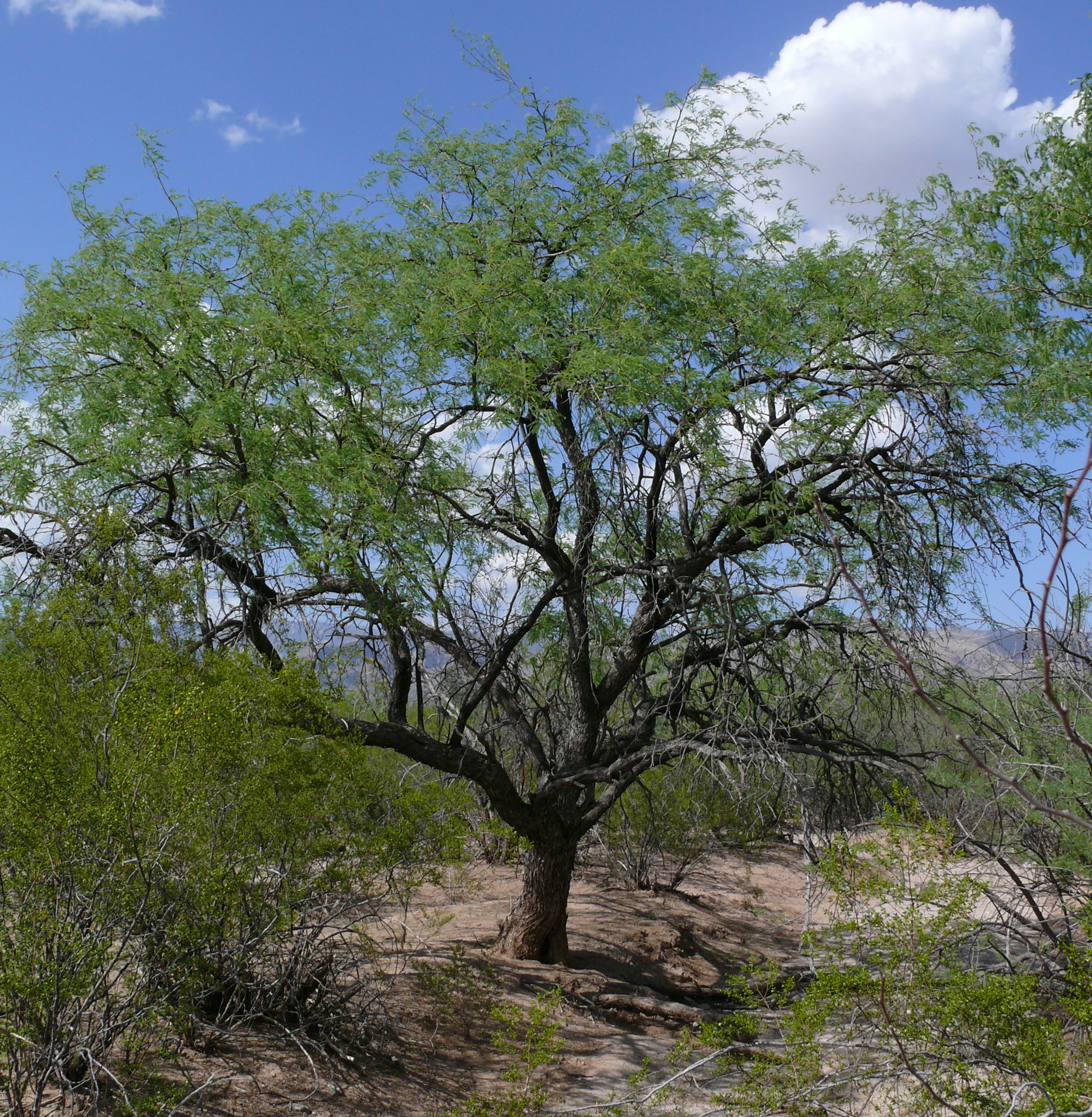
Velvet mesquite tree

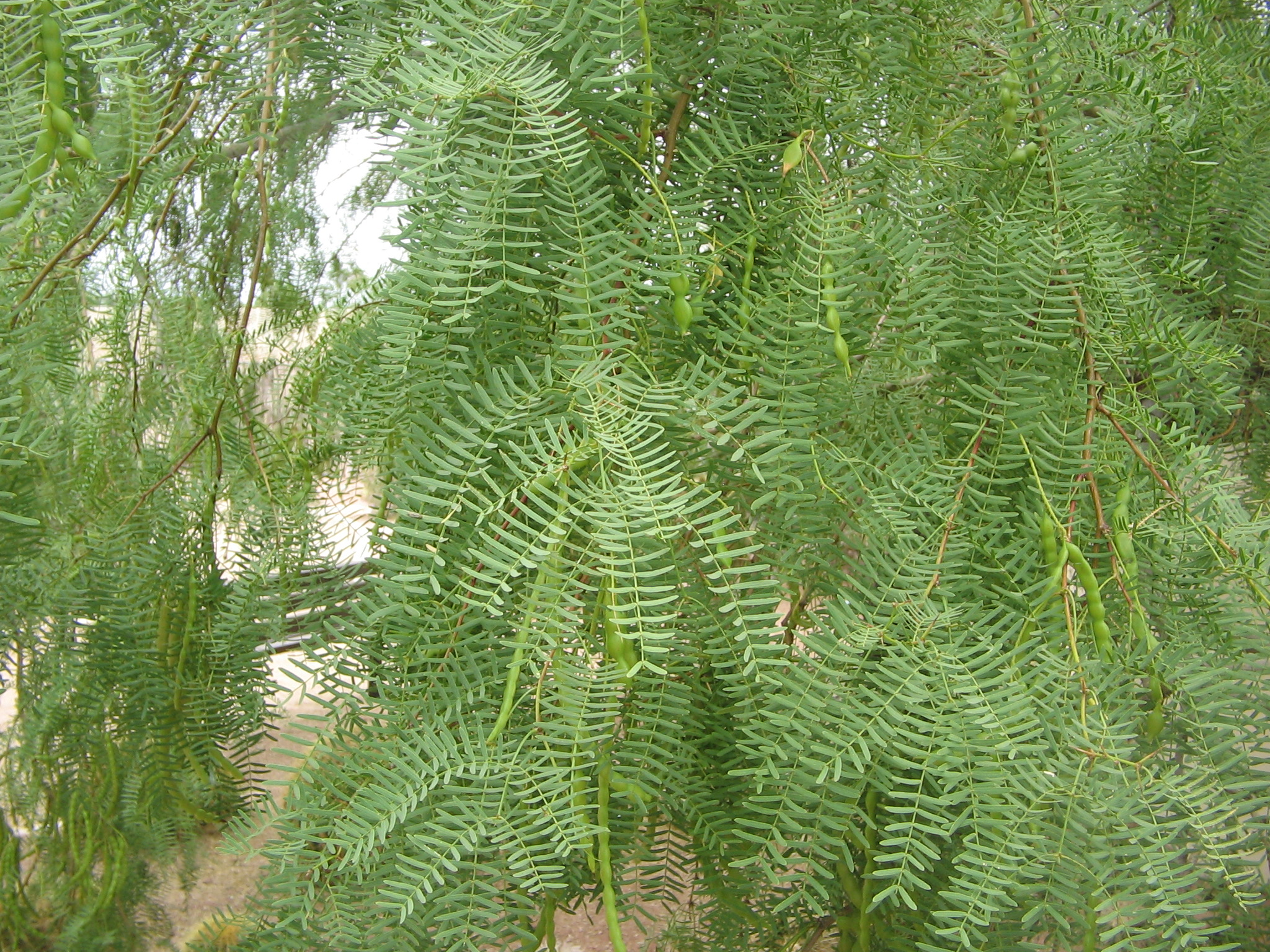
Honey mesquite foliage

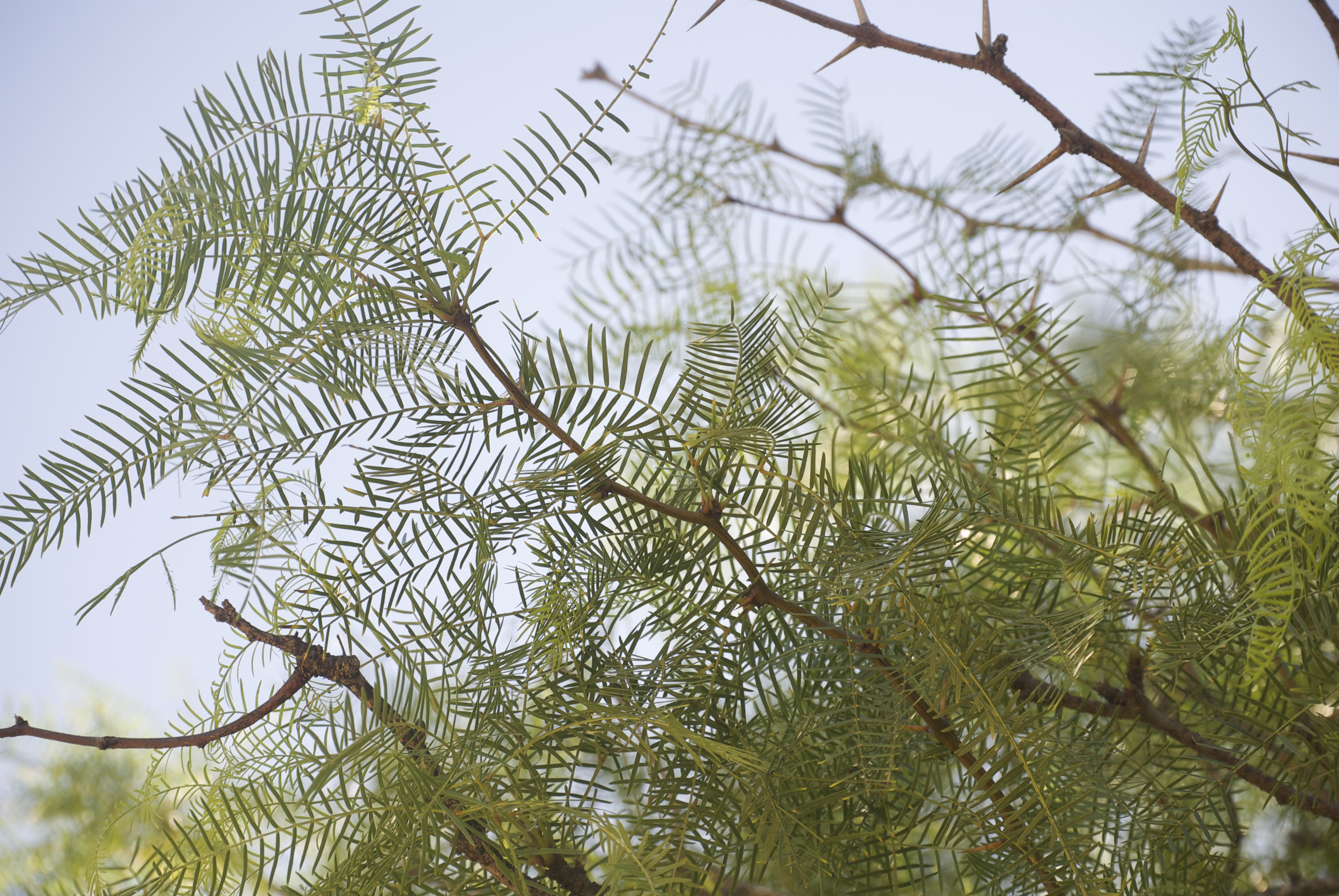
Honey mesquite foliage, with thorns visible on a bare branch

== See also ==
- Mesquite Bosque
- Tamaulipan mezquital
