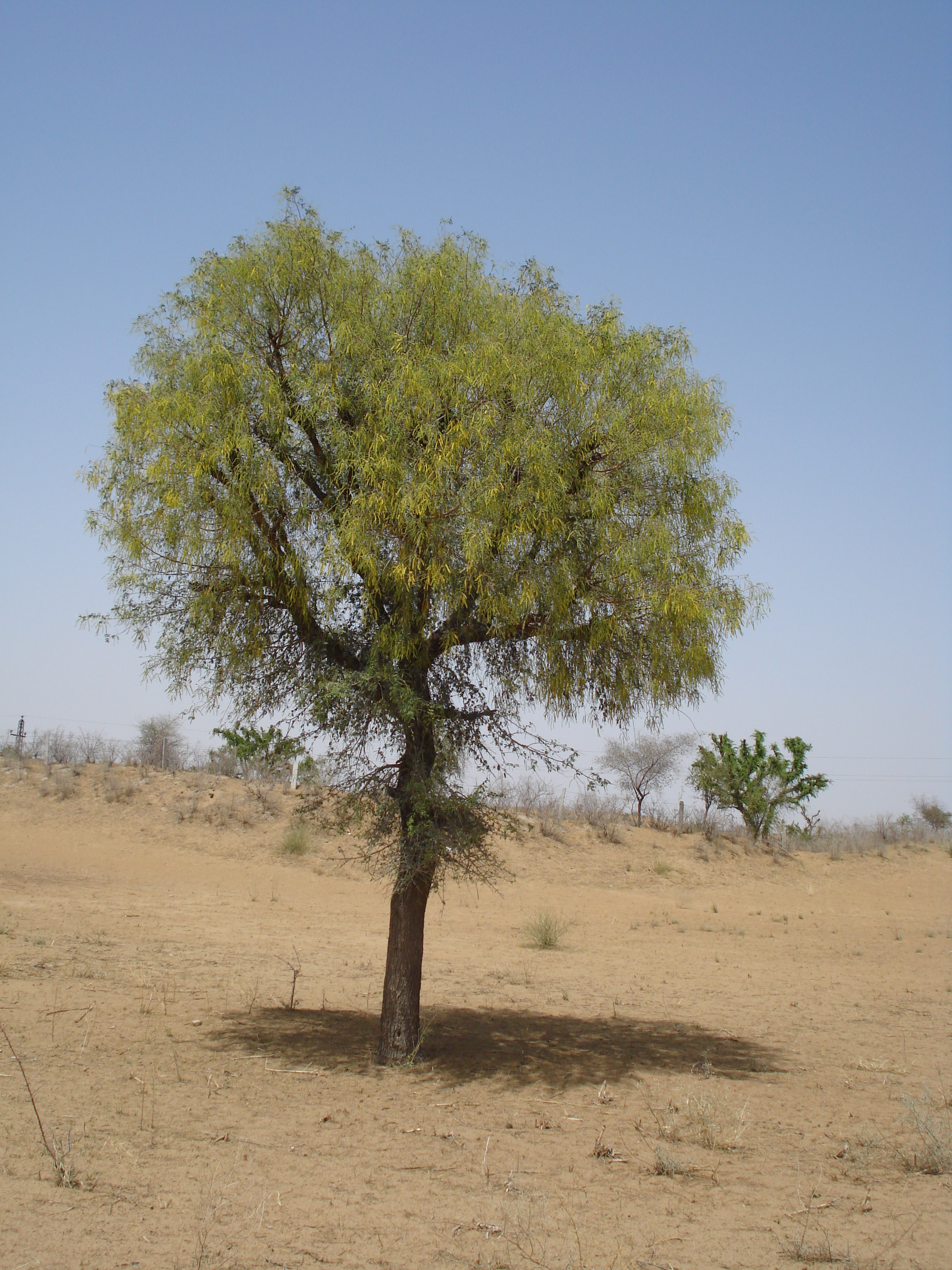
- Prosopis cineraria tree known as Khejri in Rajasthani and Hindi

Scientific classification
- Kingdom: Plantae
- Clade: Tracheophytes
- Clade: Angiosperms
- Clade: Eudicots
- Clade: Rosids
- Order: Fabales
- Family: Fabaceae
- Subfamily: Caesalpinioideae
- Clade: Mimosoid clade
- Genus: Prosopis; L.

Type species
- Prosopis spicigera L.

Species
- See text

Synonyms
- Dasiogyna Raf. (1832); Lagonychium M.Bieb. (1819); Pleuromenes Raf. (1838)

= Prosopis =

Genus of legumes

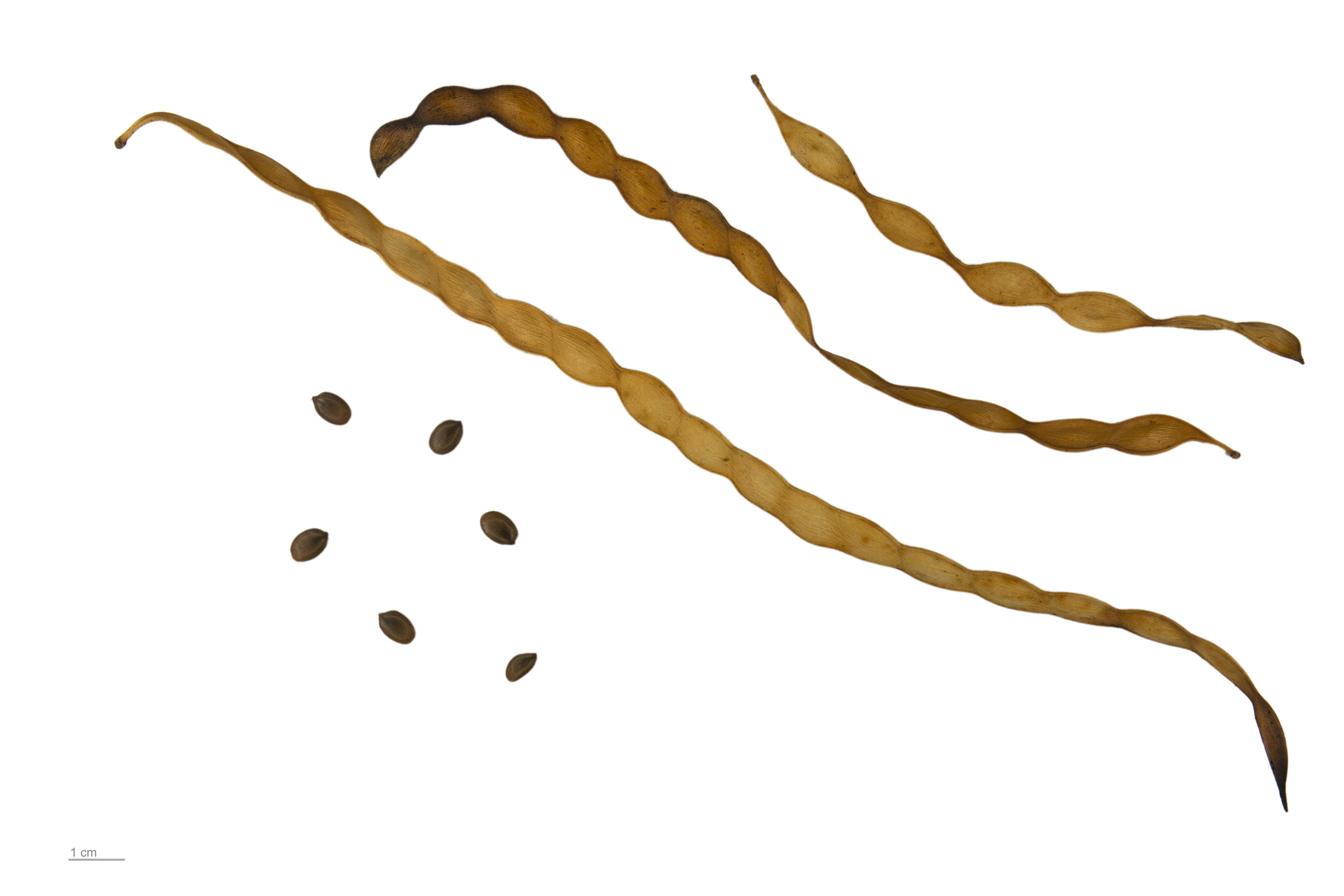
Prosopis articulata (MHNT)

Prosopis is a genus of flowering plants in the family Fabaceae. The current circumscription of the genus contains three species found in northern Africa, the Middle East, Central and South Asia. Previously it also contained around 40 species of spiny trees and shrubs found in subtropical and tropical regions of the Americas and Africa, now mostly placed in genera Strombocarpa and Neltuma. They often thrive in arid soil and are resistant to drought, on occasion developing extremely deep root systems. Their wood is usually hard, dense and durable. Their fruits are pods and may contain large amounts of sugar. The generic name means "burdock" in late Latin and originated in the Greek language.

== Species ==
The current circumscription of the genus contains three species, which are found in South Asia, the Middle East and northern Africa.

- Prosopis cineraria (L.) Druce – Persian mesquite, ghaf, khejri (Arabian Peninsula, Iran and South Asia)
- Prosopis farcta (Banks & Sol.) J.F.Macbr. – Syrian mesquite (northern Africa, Middle East, Central and South Asia)
- Prosopis koelziana Burkart (Arabian Peninsula, Iraq and Iran)

Traditionally the genus included many more species with a cosmopolitan distribution. A taxonomic monograph in 1976 by Arturo Erhardo Burkart recognised 44 species and subdivided the genus into five sections: section Anonychium in Africa, section Prosopis in Asia, and sections Algarobia, Monilicarpa and Strombocarpa in the New World. Twelve additional species in section Algarobia have since been recognised. A genomic analysis published in 2022 concluded that Prosopis was polyphyletic and that species traditionally grouped under the genus Prosopis belonged to four genera that broadly aligned with the Burkart's sections: Anonychium, Neltuma (for sections Algarobia and Monilicarpa), Prosopis, and Strombocarpa.

The following phylogenetic tree shows the relationship of these genera (bold) with other closely related mimosoid genera.

- - Anonychium (Africa; formerly Prosopis sect. Anonychium)
  - - Plathymenia
    - - Fillaeopsis
      - - Newtonia
        - - Cylicodiscus
          - - Indopiptadenia (an Indo-Nepalese monospecific genus)
            - Prosopis sensu stricto (formerly Prosopis sect. Prosopis)
          - - - Neltuma (New World, former Prosopis sects. Algarobia + Monilicarpa)
              - - Strombocarpa (New World, formerly Prosopis sect. Strombocarpa)
                - Xerocladia (Namibian / Namaqualand monospecific endemic genus)
            - remaining core mimosoids (many genera)

=== Selected former species ===
African species now placed in Anonychium

- Former Prosopis sect. Anonychium
  - Prosopis africana (Guill. & Perr.) Taub. – African mesquite or gele (in Malinke, traditional djembe wood)

New World species now placed in Strombocarpa

- Former Prosopis sect. Strombocarpa
  - Prosopis abbreviata Benth. – algarrobillo espinoso
  - Prosopis pubescens Benth. – screwbean mesquite
  - Prosopis reptans Benth. – tornillo
  - Prosopis strombulifera (Lam.) Benth. – creeping mesquite, Argentine screwbean
  - Prosopis tamarugo Phil. – tamarugo

New World species now placed in Neltuma

- Former section Monilicarpa
  - Prosopis argentina Burkart
- Former section Algarobia
  - Prosopis affinis Spreng. – nandubay, algarrobillo, espinillo, Ibopé-morotí
  - Prosopis alba Griseb. – algarrobo blanco; ibopé or igopé (Guaraní)
  - Prosopis caldenia Burkart – caldén
  - Prosopis chilensis (Molina) Stuntz – algarrobo Chileno, algarrobo blanco
  - Prosopis fiebrigii Harms
  - Prosopis flexuosa DC. – alpataco, algarrobo negro
  - Prosopis glandulosa Torr. – honey mesquite
  - Prosopis hassleri Harms
  - Prosopis juliflora (Sw.) DC. This has become established as an invasive weed in Africa, Asia, Australia and elsewhere.
  - Prosopis kuntzei Harms ex Kuntze – itín, barba de tigre, carandá, palo mataco
  - Prosopis laevigata (Humb. & Bonpl. ex Willd.) M.C.Johnst. – smooth mesquite
  - Prosopis nigra (Griseb.) Hieron. – algarrobo negro, algarrobo amarillo, algarrobo dulce, algarrobo morado
  - Prosopis pallida (Humb. & Bonpl. ex Willd.) Kunth – American carob, huarango, kiawe (Hawaiian)
  - Prosopis rojasiana Burkart
  - Prosopis ruscifolia Griseb. – vinal
  - Prosopis velutina Wooton – velvet mesquite

Other species formerly placed in Prosopis

- Acacia atramentaria Benth. (as P. astringens Gillies ex Hook. & Arn.)
- Entada elephantina (Burch.) S.A.O’Donnell & G.P.Lewis (as P. elephantina (Burch.) E.Mey. or P. elephantorrhiza Spreng.)
- Prosopidastrum globosum (Gillies ex Hook. & Arn.) Burkart (as P. globosa Gillies ex Hook. & Arn.)

== General references ==
- Paciecznik, N. M., Harris P. J. C., & S. J. Smith. 2003. Identifying Tropical Prosopis Species: A Field Guide. HDRA, Coventry, UK. ISBN 0-905343-34-4.
- Handbook on taxonomy of Prosopis in Mexico, Peru and Chile (FAO Document Repository)
- Plant Walk I: Old Main (website of the Vascular Plant Herbarium of the University of Arizona in Tucson)
- Plant Walk 1 UofA
- Plant Walk 2 UofA
