= P. abbreviata =

P. abbreviata may refer to:

- Polycentropsis abbreviata, the African leaffish
- Prosopis abbreviata, a flowering plant in the pea family
