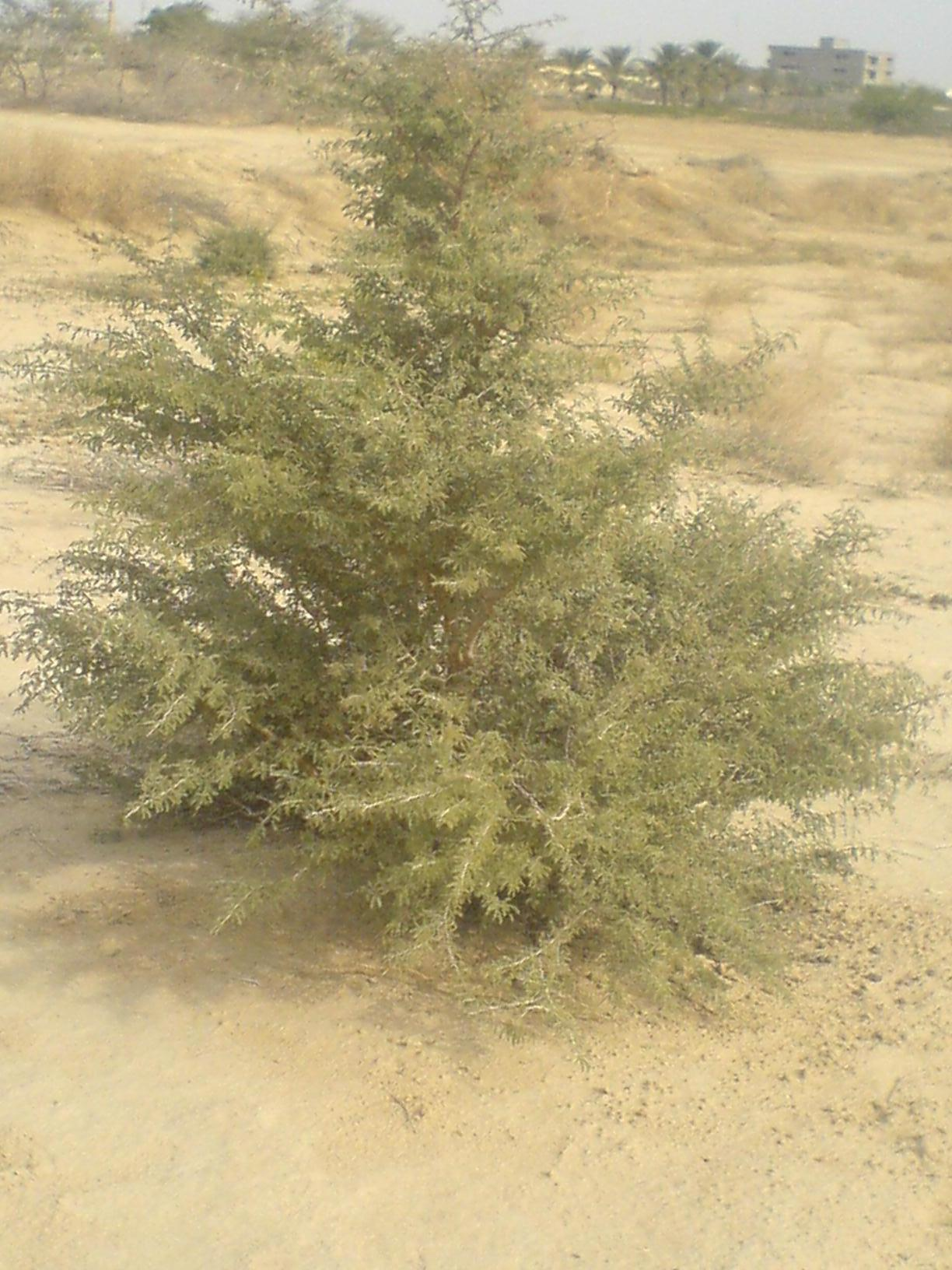

Scientific classification
- Kingdom: Plantae
- Clade: Tracheophytes
- Clade: Angiosperms
- Clade: Eudicots
- Clade: Rosids
- Order: Fabales
- Family: Fabaceae
- Subfamily: Caesalpinioideae
- Clade: Mimosoid clade
- Genus: Prosopis
- Species: P. koelziana

Binomial name
- Prosopis koelziana Burkart

Synonyms
- Prosopis koelziana var. puberula J.Léonard

= Prosopis koelziana =

Species of legume

Prosopis koelziana is a species of plant in the genus Prosopis. It is found in the Arabian Peninsula, Iraq and Iran.

It was once widespread in its natural habitats, concentrated in river courses and desert streams, in wet agricultural lands in oases, around some lakes, swamps and salt marshes, as well as in some dry sand dunes. However, its presence is now limited to some of its historical sites only and it has become extinct from most of its original habitats due to agricultural and urban expansion in its ancient forests, overgrazing by livestock, and the use of its trees as a source of natural firewood, so only a little of it remains.

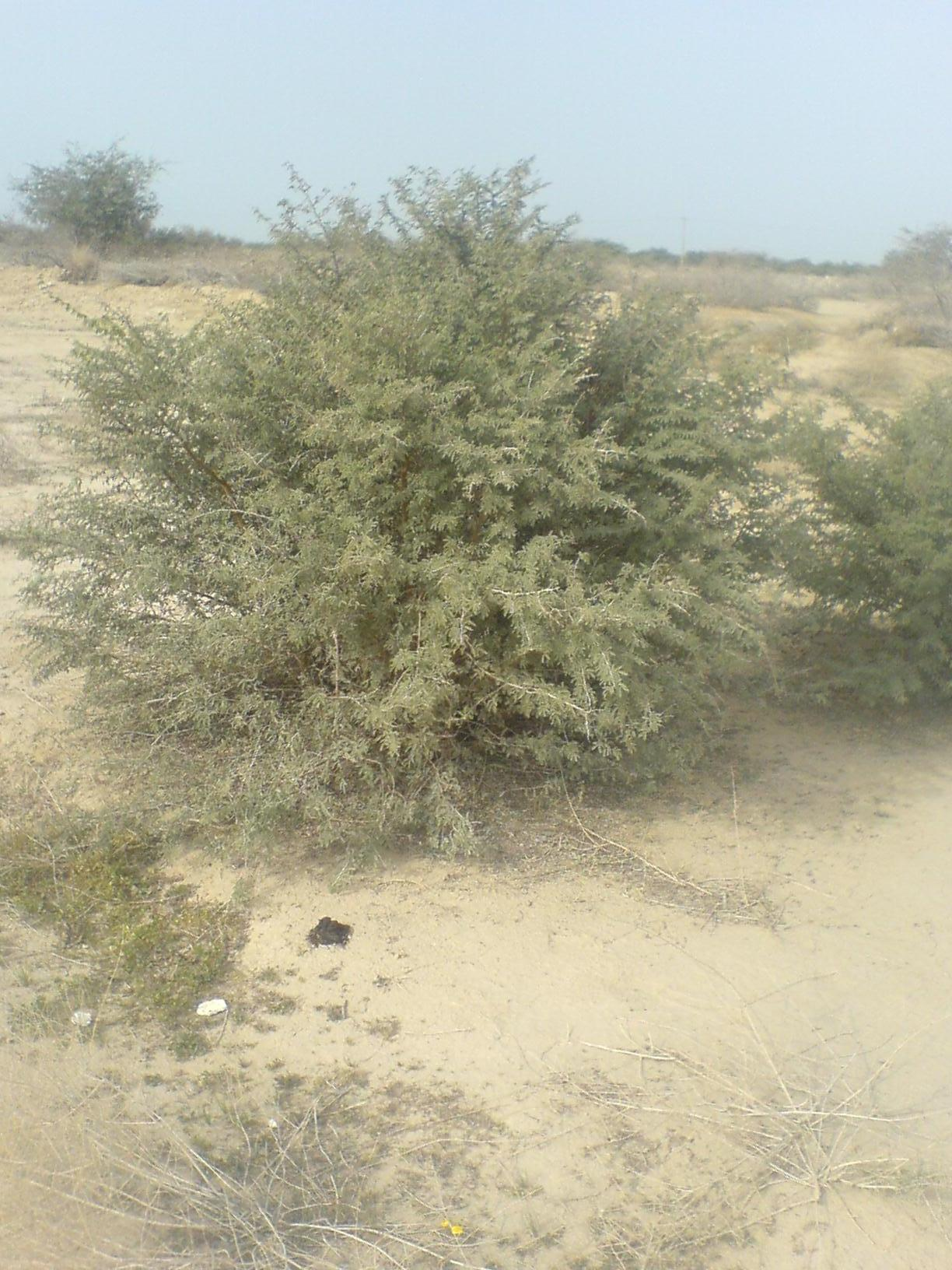
Prosopis koelziana

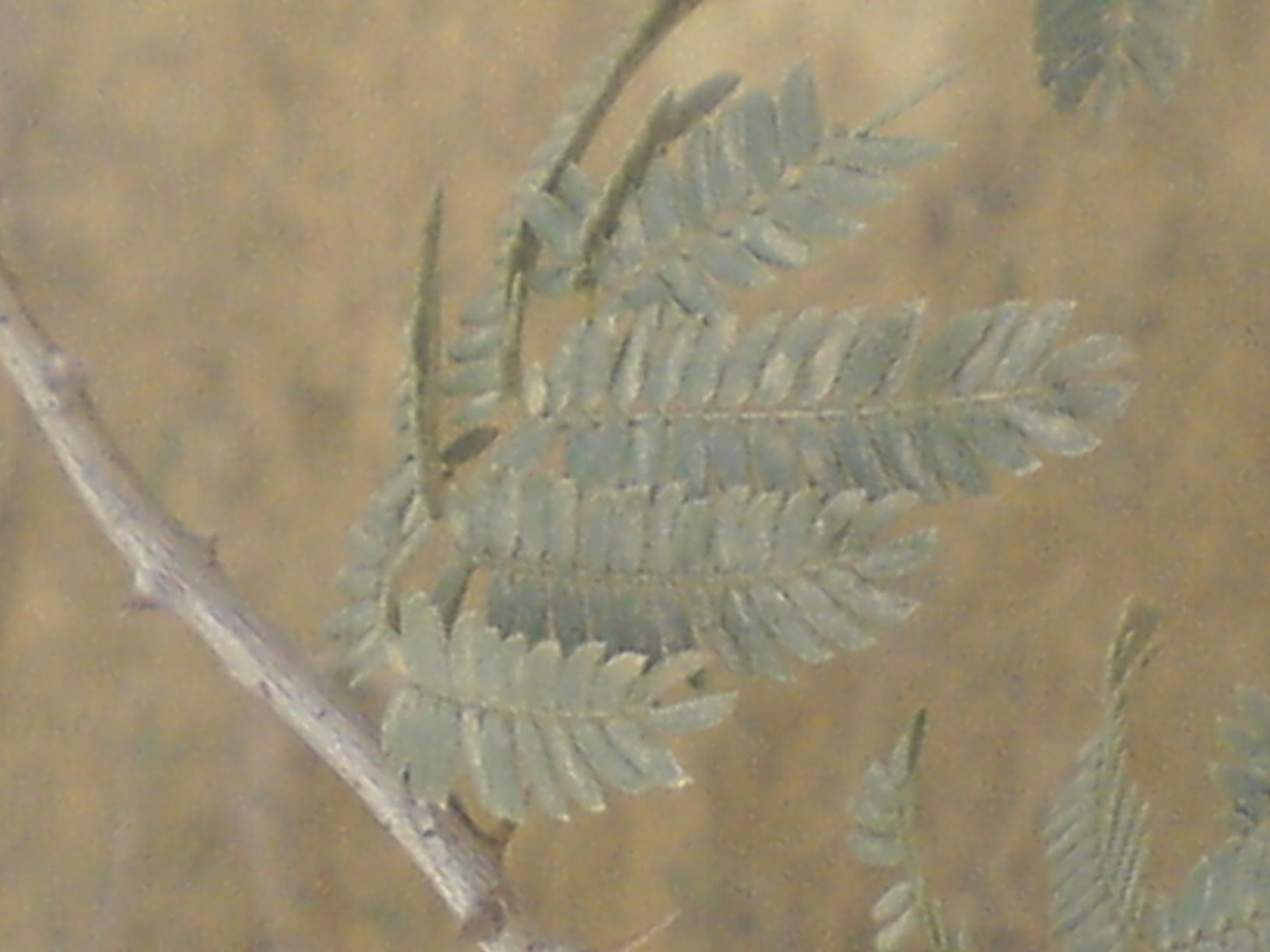
Prosopis koelziana
