= Mesquite flour =

Flour made from dried ground mesquite pods

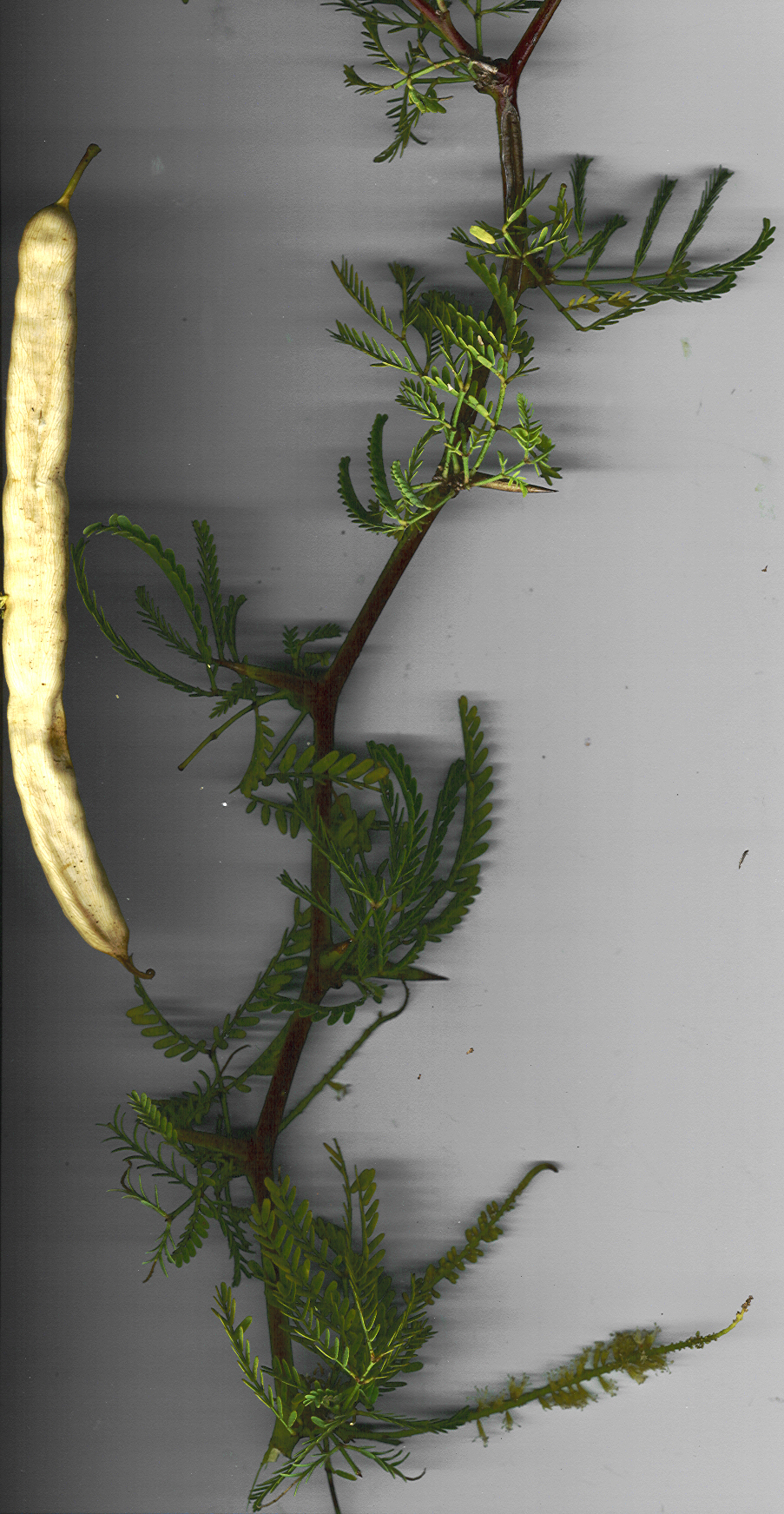
Prosopis pallida branch and seed pod

Mesquite flour is made from the dried and ground pods of the mesquite (some Prosopis spp.), a tree that grows throughout Mexico and the southwestern US in arid and drought-prone climates. The flour made from the long, beige-colored seedpods has a sweet, slightly nutty flavor and can be used in a wide variety of applications. It has a high-protein, low-glycemic content and can serve as a gluten-free replacement for flours that contain gluten.

In the past, indigenous Americans relied on mesquite pods as an important food source. The bean pods of the mesquite tree are dried and ground into a flour. This flour is rich in dietary fiber (25%) and protein (13%), and it is low in fat (around 3%). It also contains significant quantities of calcium, magnesium, potassium, iron, zinc, and the amino acid lysine.
