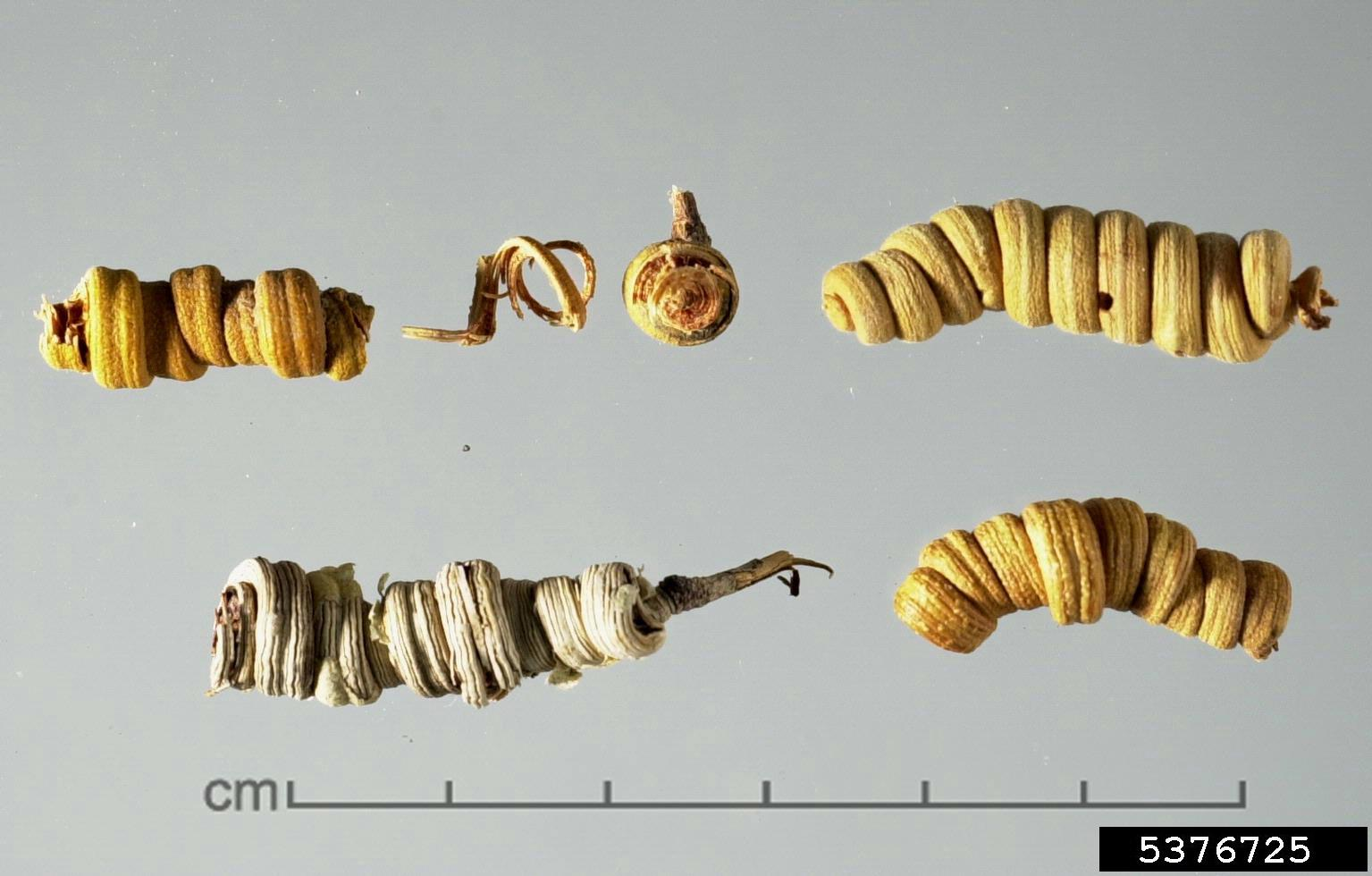
- seed pods

Scientific classification
- Kingdom: Plantae
- Clade: Tracheophytes
- Clade: Angiosperms
- Clade: Eudicots
- Clade: Rosids
- Order: Fabales
- Family: Fabaceae
- Subfamily: Caesalpinioideae
- Clade: Mimosoid clade
- Genus: Strombocarpa
- Species: S. strombulifera

Binomial name
- Strombocarpa strombulifera (Lam.) A.Gray

Synonyms
- Prosopis strombulifera

= Strombocarpa strombulifera =

Species of legume

Strombocarpa strombulifera (formerli Prosopis strombulifera) is a species of mesquite or algarrobo, a shrub in the legume family. It is known by the English common names Argentine screwbean and creeping screwbean and the Spanish common name retortuño. This shrub is native to Argentina, where it grows in arid and saline soils. It became well known in California after it was introduced to Imperial County and took hold in the wild, growing as an invasive noxious weed. The plant grows from a network of long, spreading roots and may grow to three meters in height. Many plants may grow together in an area, forming a monotypic stand. The shrub has waxy-textured leaves made up of a pair of leaflets which are each divided into several pairs of secondary leaflets each up to a centimeter long. Whitish spines up to 2 cm long appear near the leaf bases. The inflorescence is a spherical head of many very narrow tubelike yellow flowers, the head measuring about 1.5 cm wide. The fruit is a bright yellow seed pod coiled tightly into a cylindrical stick up to 5 cm long. It contains several greenish seeds, each about 0.5 cm long.
