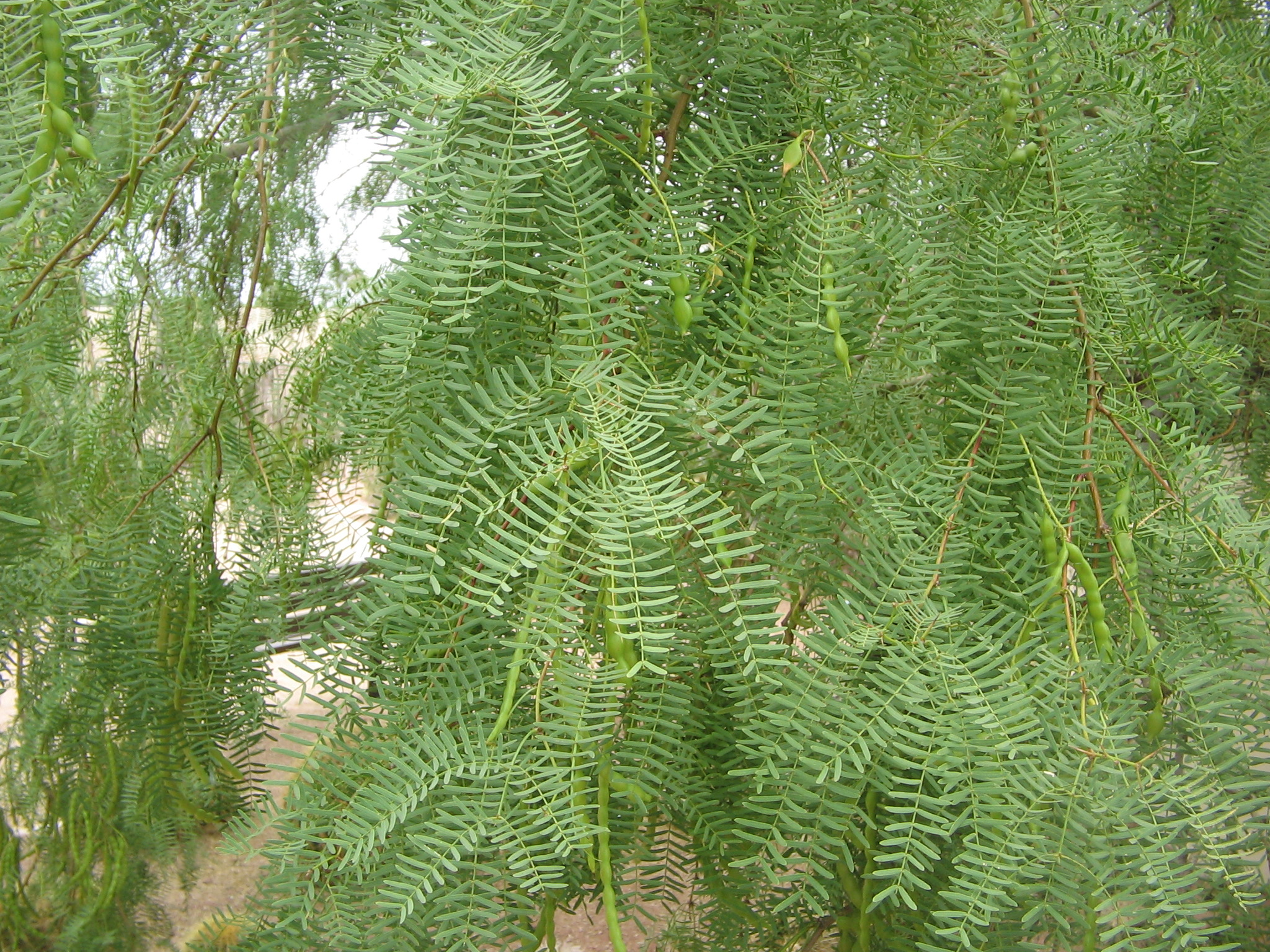
- Foliage with seedpods

Conservation status
- Least Concern (IUCN 3.1)

- Secure (NatureServe)

Scientific classification
- Kingdom: Plantae
- Clade: Tracheophytes
- Clade: Angiosperms
- Clade: Eudicots
- Clade: Rosids
- Order: Fabales
- Family: Fabaceae
- Subfamily: Caesalpinioideae
- Clade: Mimosoid clade
- Genus: Neltuma
- Species: N. glandulosa

Binomial name
- Neltuma glandulosa (Torr.) Britton & Rose

Varieties
- Prosopis glandulosa var. glandulosa Prosopis glandulosa var. torreyana
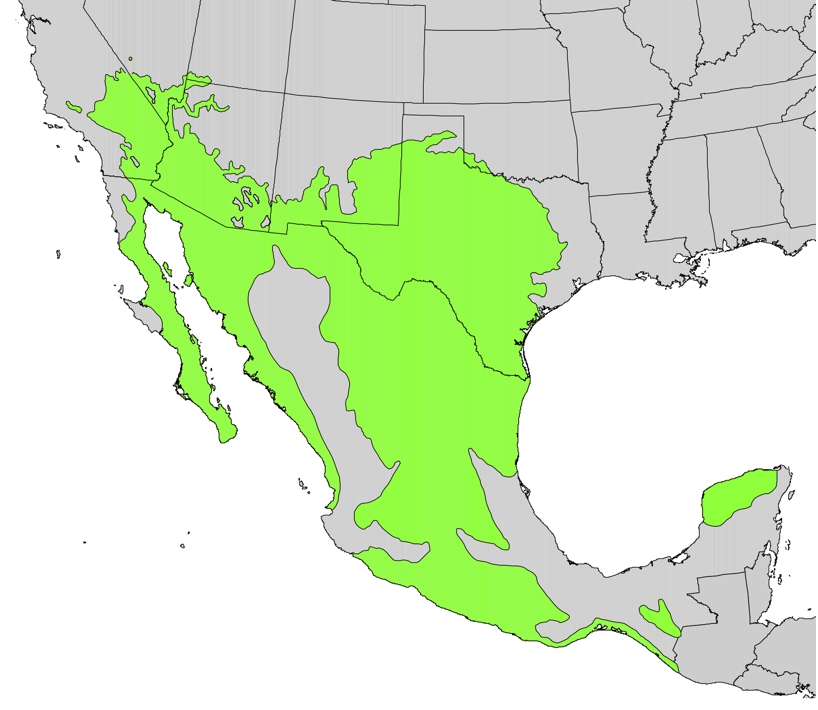
- Natural range

Synonyms
- Prosopis glandulosa Torr.; Prosopis juliflora var. glandulosa (Torr.)

= Neltuma glandulosa =

Species of tree

Neltuma glandulosa, formerly Prosopis glandulosa, commonly known as honey mesquite, is a species of small to medium-sized, thorny shrub or tree in the legume family (Fabaceae).

== Distribution ==
The plant is primarily native to the Southwestern United States and Northern Mexico. Its range extends on the northeast through Texas and into southwestern Kansas and Oklahoma and northwestern Louisiana (the South Central states), and west to southern California.

It can be part of the Mesquite Bosque plant association community in the Sonoran Desert ecoregion of California and Arizona (U.S.), and Sonora state (México), and in the Chihuahuan Desert of New Mexico and Texas in the US, and Chihuahua in Mexico.

== Description ==
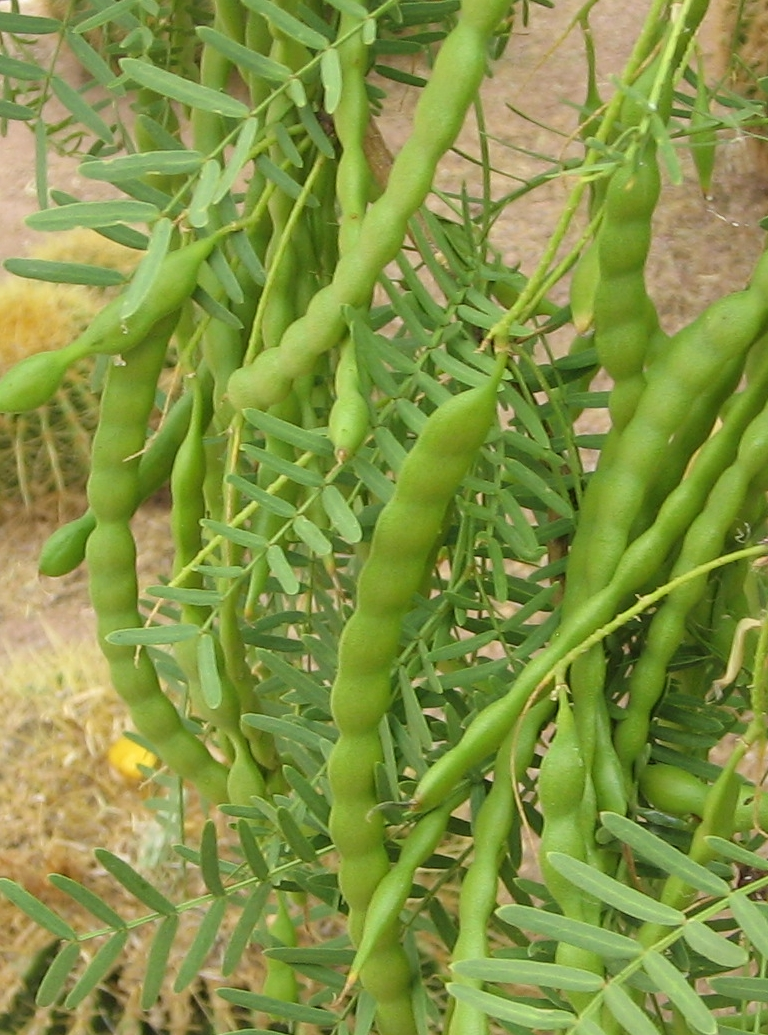
Seedpods

Neltuma glandulosa has rounded, big and floppy, drooping branches with feathery foliage and straight, paired thorns on twigs. This tree normally reaches 20–30 ft (6.1–9.1 m), but can grow as tall as 50 ft (15 m). It is considered to have a medium growth rate.

It flowers from March to November, with pale, yellow, elongated spikes and bears straight seedpods, which are yellow or maroon. The seeds are eaten by a variety of animals, such as scaled quail. Other animals, including deer, collared peccaries, coyotes, cactus mice, and jackrabbits, feed on both pods and vegetation.

=== Varieties ===
- Prosopis glandulosa var. glandulosa (syn. Prosopis chilensis var. glandulosa (Torr.) Standl., Prosopis juliflora var. glandulosa (Torr.) Cockerell)
- Prosopis glandulosa var. torreyana (L.D.Benson) M.C.Johnst. (syn. Prosopis juliflora var. torreyana L.D.Benson)

=== Invasive species ===
Prosopis glandulosa has been intentionally introduced into at least a half-dozen countries, including Australia, Botswana, Namibia and South Africa. The IUCN considers it as one of the world's 100 worst invasive species outside its native habitat range.

The seeds are disseminated by livestock that graze on the sweet pods, and the shrubs can invade grasslands, with cattlemen regarding mesquites as range weeds to be eradicated. Due to latent buds underground, permanent removal is difficult. Cutting them will only coppice them: A single-trunked tree that is cut down will soon be replaced by a multi-trunked version.

== Uses ==
Neltuma glandulosa shrubs and trees provide shelter and nest building material for wildlife, and produce seed pods in abundance containing beans that are a seasonal food for diverse birds and small mammal species. As the common name indicates, honey mesquite is a honey plant that supports native pollinator species of bees and other insects, and cultivated honey bees. It is a larval host for the long-tailed skipper and Reakirt's blue butterflies.

Mesquite flour is high in protein, low in carbohydrates, and can be used in recipes as a gluten-free substitute for wheat flour.

Within its native range, its wood smoke is used to flavor meats when cooked over a mesquite fire. This is particularly popular in Texas in the US.

In Namibia, although an invasive species, it has qualities that have made it useful for humans, including: growing extremely rapidly there, having very dense shade, abundantly producing seed pods, and a readily available firewood.

=== Indigenous peoples ===
The indigenous peoples of California and southwestern North America use parts of N. glandulosa as a medicinal plant, food source, building and tools material, and fuel. The Cahuilla eat the blossoms and pods, which were ground into meal for cake. The Pueblo peoples of New Mexico in the southwest United States use the seeds to produce mesquite flour for making traditional horno bread. The thorns of the plant are used as tattoo needles, and the ashes for tattoos, by the Cahuilla and Serrano Indians of Southern California. Its dense and durable wood is prized for making tools and arrow points, and for the unique flavor it lends to foods cooked over it. The deep taproots, often larger than the trunks, are dug up for firewood.

This species of mesquite, known as haas (pronounced [ʔaːs]) by the Seri people of northwestern Mexico, is very important for food and nonfood uses. The Seris have specific names for various stages of the growth of the mesquite pod. Historically, it was a very important wild food plant because it fruits even during drought years.
