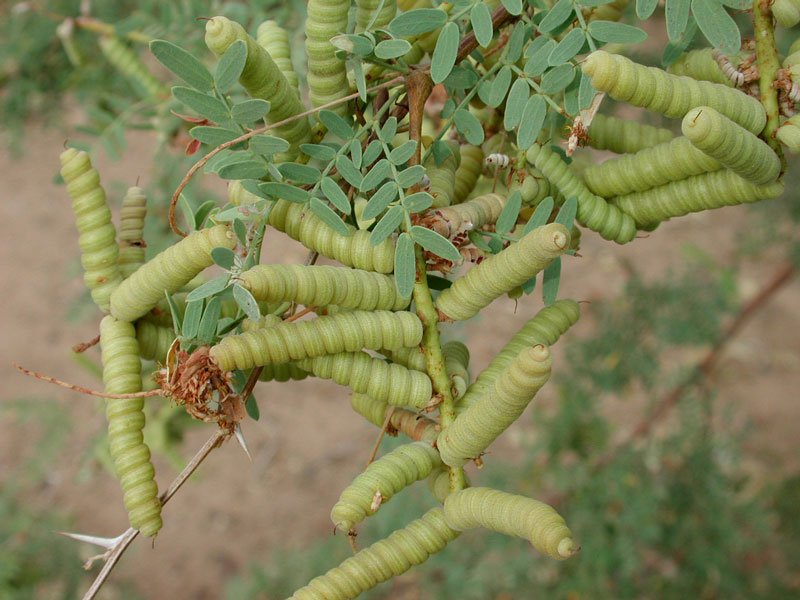
- S. pubescens

Scientific classification
- Kingdom: Plantae
- Clade: Tracheophytes
- Clade: Angiosperms
- Clade: Eudicots
- Clade: Rosids
- Order: Fabales
- Family: Fabaceae
- Subfamily: Caesalpinioideae
- Clade: Mimosoid clade
- Genus: Strombocarpa (Benth.) Engelm. & A.Gray (1845)

species
- 10; see text

Synonyms
- Sopropis Britton & Rose (1928); Spirolobium A.D.Orb. (1839), nom. rej.

= Strombocarpa =

Genus of flowering plants

Strombocarpa is a genus of flowering plants in the pea family (Fabaceae). This genus was previously classified as a section of genus Prosopis. It includes ten species, which are native to the southwestern United States and northern Mexico, or to southern South America from Peru through Bolivia and northern and central Chile to southern Argentina.

Ten species are accepted:

- Strombocarpa abbreviata (Benth.) Hutch. ex C.E.Hughes & G.P.Lewis
- Strombocarpa burkartii (Muñoz) C.E.Hughes & G.P.Lewis
- Strombocarpa cinerascens A.Gray
- Strombocarpa ferox (Griseb.) C.E.Hughes & G.P.Lewis
- Strombocarpa palmeri (S.Watson) C.E.Hughes & G.P.Lewis
- Strombocarpa pubescens (Benth.) A.Gray
- Strombocarpa reptans (Benth.) A.Gray
- Strombocarpa strombulifera (Lam.) A.Gray
- Strombocarpa tamarugo (Phil.) C.E.Hughes & G.P.Lewis
- Strombocarpa torquata (Lag.) Hutch. ex C.E.Hughes & G.P.Lewis
