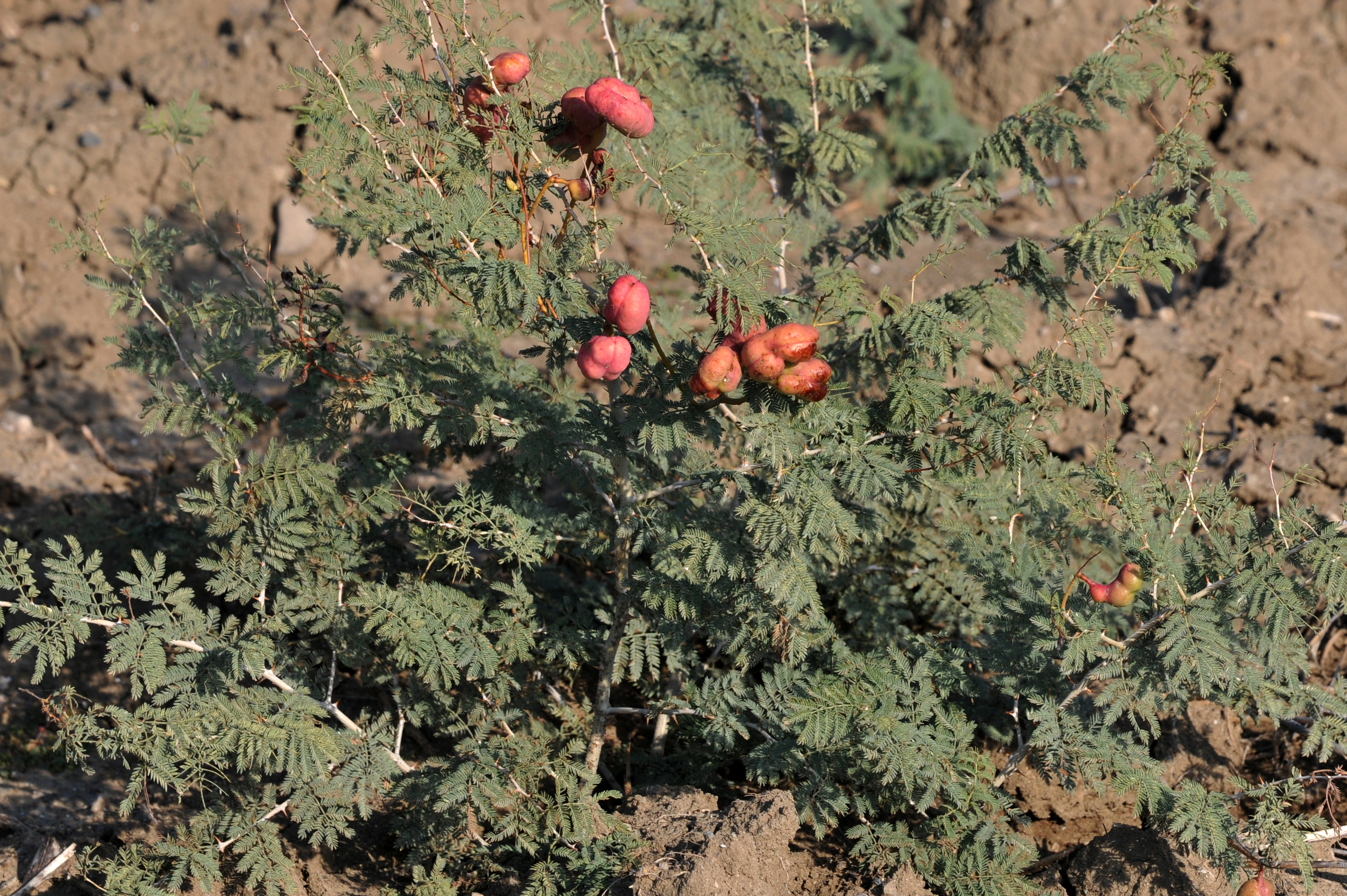

Conservation status
- Least Concern (IUCN 3.1)

Scientific classification
- Kingdom: Plantae
- Clade: Tracheophytes
- Clade: Angiosperms
- Clade: Eudicots
- Clade: Rosids
- Order: Fabales
- Family: Fabaceae
- Subfamily: Caesalpinioideae
- Clade: Mimosoid clade
- Genus: Prosopis
- Species: P. farcta

Binomial name
- Prosopis farcta (Banks & Sol.) J.F.Macbr.

Synonyms
- Many, see text

= Prosopis farcta =

Species of legume

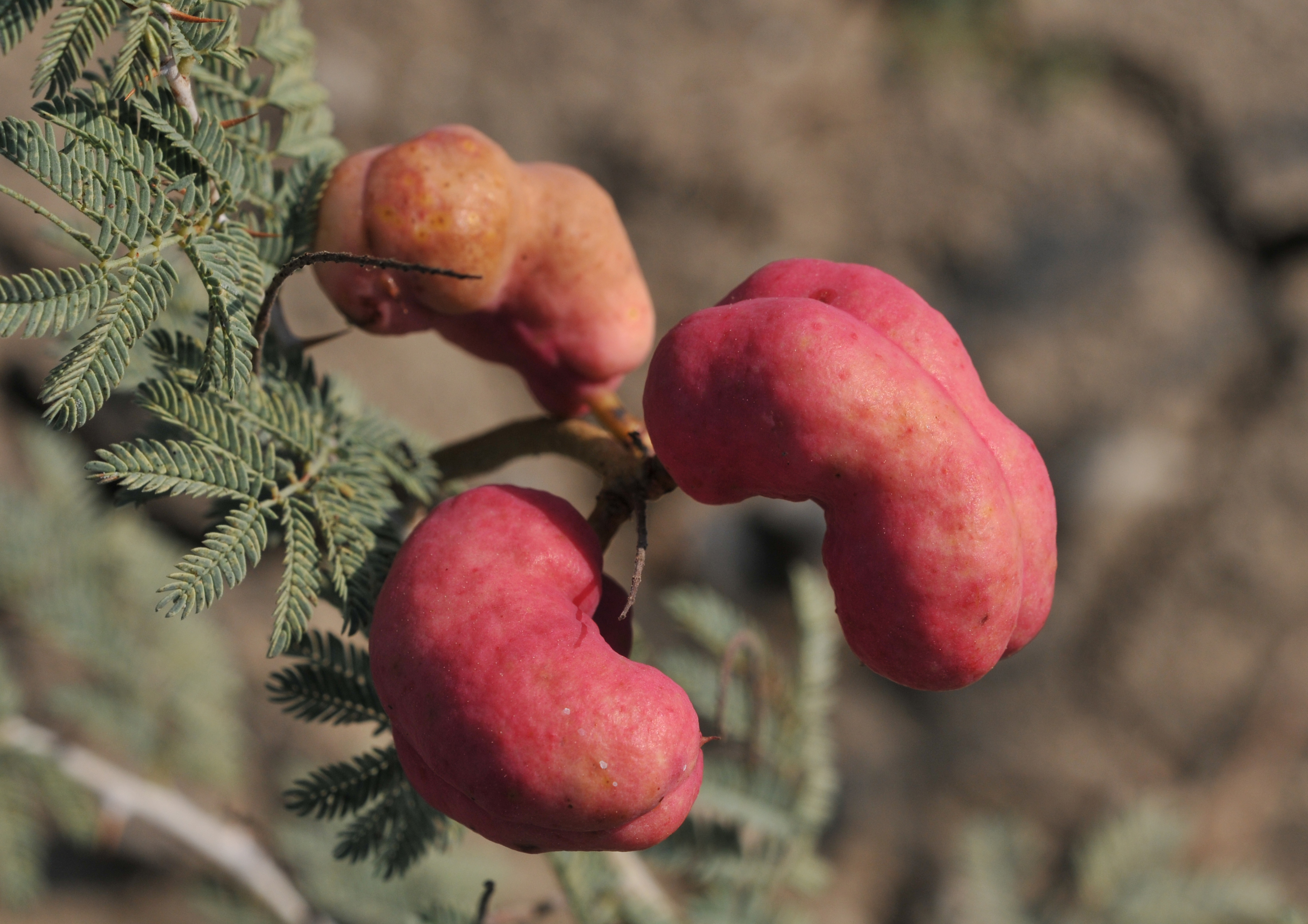

Prosopis farcta, the Syrian mesquite, is a species of the genus Prosopis, growing in and around the Middle East.

== Botanical details ==
Prosopis farcta is a below-ground tree. Above ground, it looks like a shrub with a height of 20–100 cm (in rare cases up to 4m high). In addition, below ground the mesquite has a root system which is really a trunk with branches going as deep as 20 meters or more underground. So it is really a tree, and only the treetop protrudes above ground level. The "treetop" consists of a collection of shrubs which can extend over 1000 square meters or more, all of them connected to the same trunk.

The shrubs grow noticeably in the warm summer months. The mesquite can survive difficult weather and soil conditions (including saline soil), and flourishes in Mediterranean heat, but dislikes shadows.

The plant is common across the Middle East. It can be found as far north as southern Russia in the north, India in the east, and Algeria in the west. It is considered part of the Irano-Turanian Region.

The leaves are green-grey. The plant is deciduous, and leaf fall is dependent on climate conditions at the end of summer and in autumn. The branches are thorny.

Between May and August, the plant produces small yellowish flowers. The plant is rich in pollen, and is a significant pollination plant during Middle Eastern summers.

The fruit is edible. During its ripening, the color changes from pink to brown. Its texture is spongy and its taste bland. It has an irregular vesicle-like shape, and is covered with a leathery peel. Its seeds are small, brown, and flat. Bedouin nomads are known to eat the fruit roasted.

== Human uses ==
The mesquite is considered very damaging to agriculture in deep and heavy soils. To eliminate it, one must not only remove the shrubs, but also completely remove all the roots-trunk from underground. If a small piece of root is left deep underground, a new mesquite can grow from it.

In folk medicine, the fruit is used as a diuretic, and against constipation, hemorrhoids, tooth pain, diabetes, kidney stones, skin conditions, and more.

== Toxicity ==
By and large the plant and its constituent parts are not toxic. There has been just one report where four children developed mild clinical toxicity after ingestion of seeds with pods.
