= Mesquite Bosque =

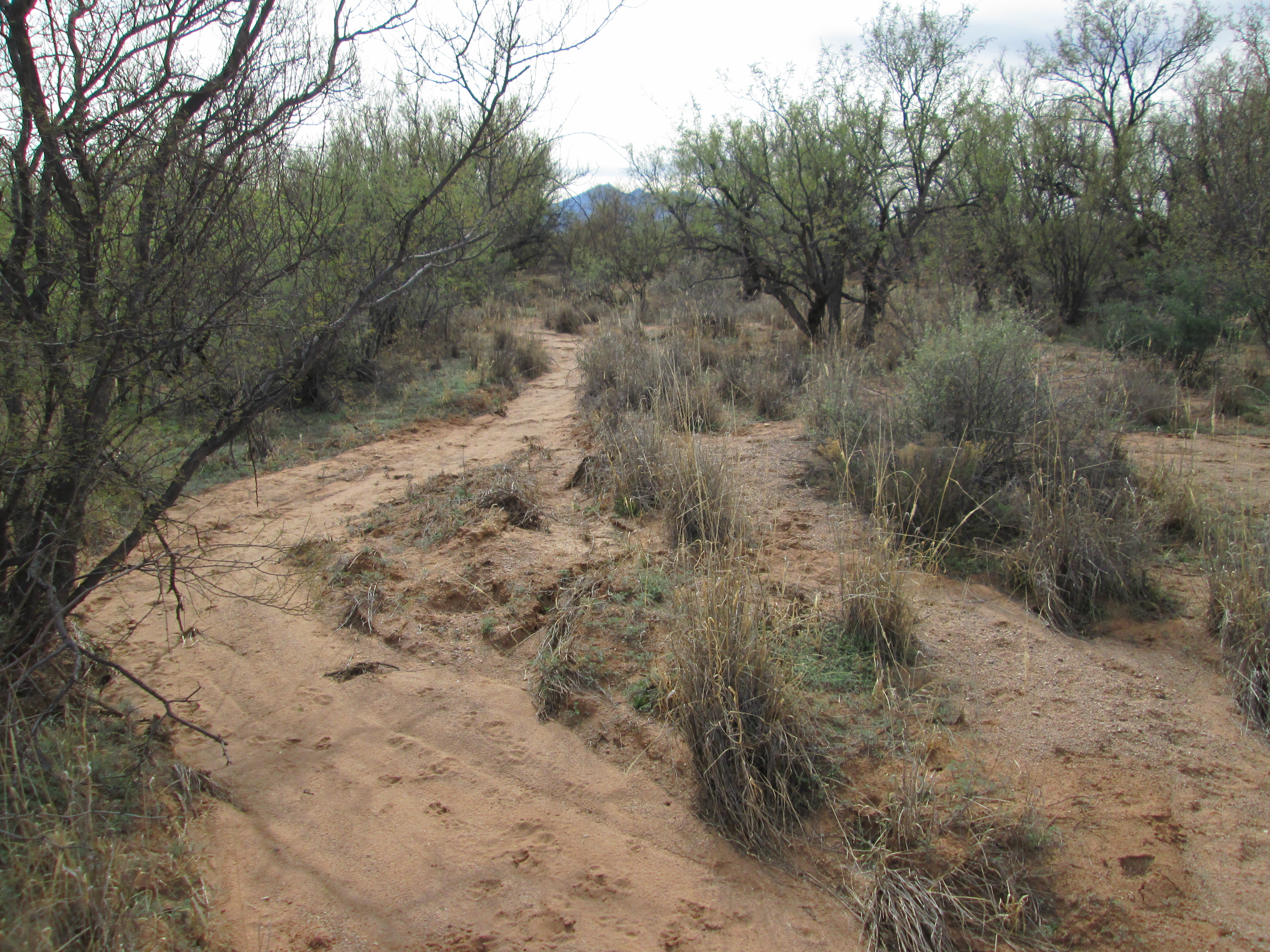
Mesquite Bosque south of Tucson, Arizona.

Mesquite Bosque is a vegetative association within the Southwestern United States, under the Kuchler scheme of plant association categories.

== Geography ==
The Mesquite Bosque association occurs in the Sonoran Desert, with mesquite (Neltuma spp.) dominating. In some cases, this plant association is along xeric portions of desert floodplains, bajadas, and arroyos.

== Plant species ==
The mesquite (Prosopis) species include:

- Velvet mesquite - Neltuma velutina
- Screwbean mesquite - Strombocarpa pubescens - "Tornillo"
- Honey mesquite - Neltuma glandulosa

Other species include:

- Catclaw acacia - Acacia greggii
- Fremont cottonwood - Populus fremontii
- Desert mistletoe - Phoradendron californicum
- California fan palm - Washingtonia filifera - the Mesquite Bosque association is one of the Kuchler scheme designation areas where this endangered palm may occur.

== Gallery ==
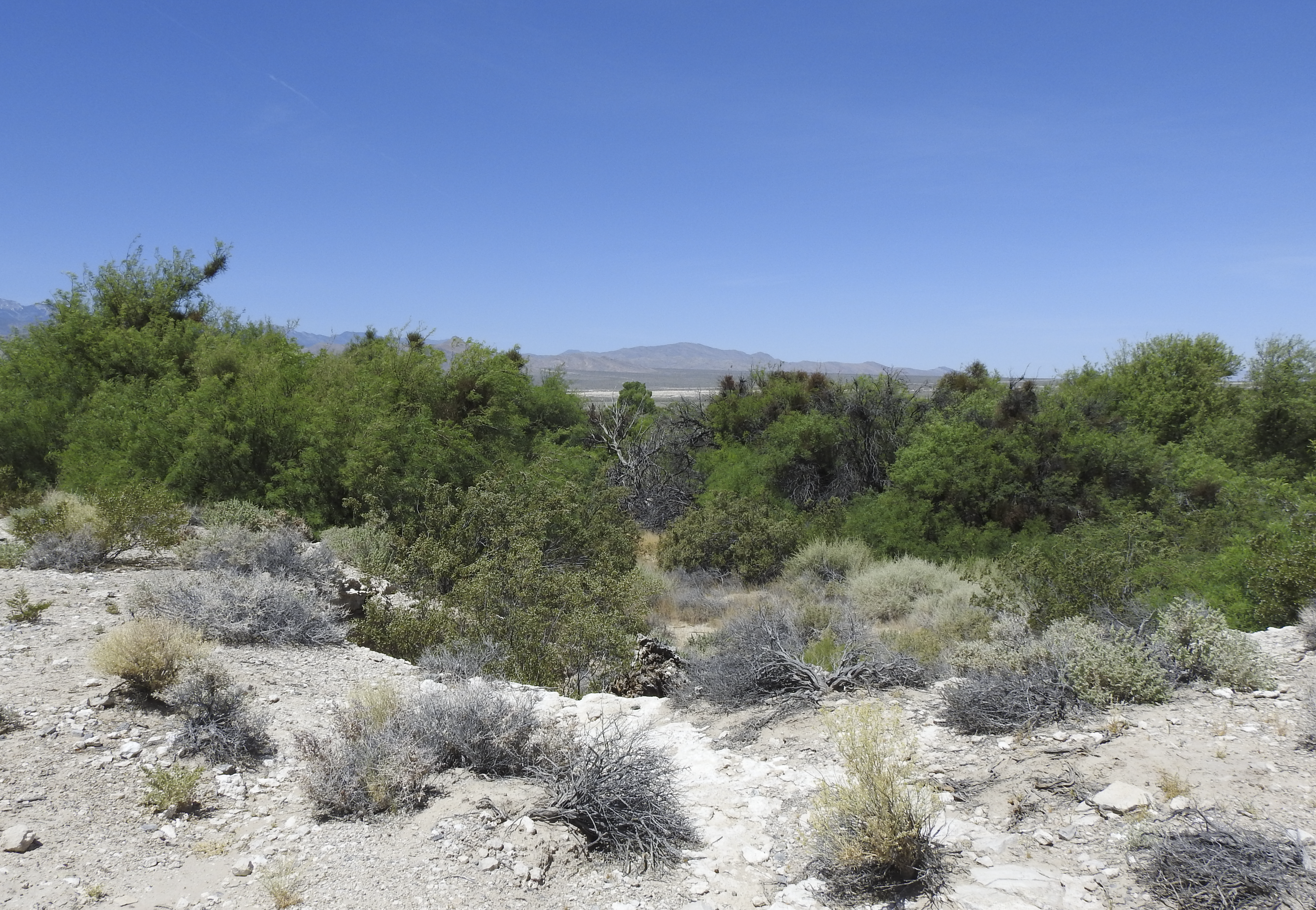
Looking North Into The Mesquite Bosque at the DNR

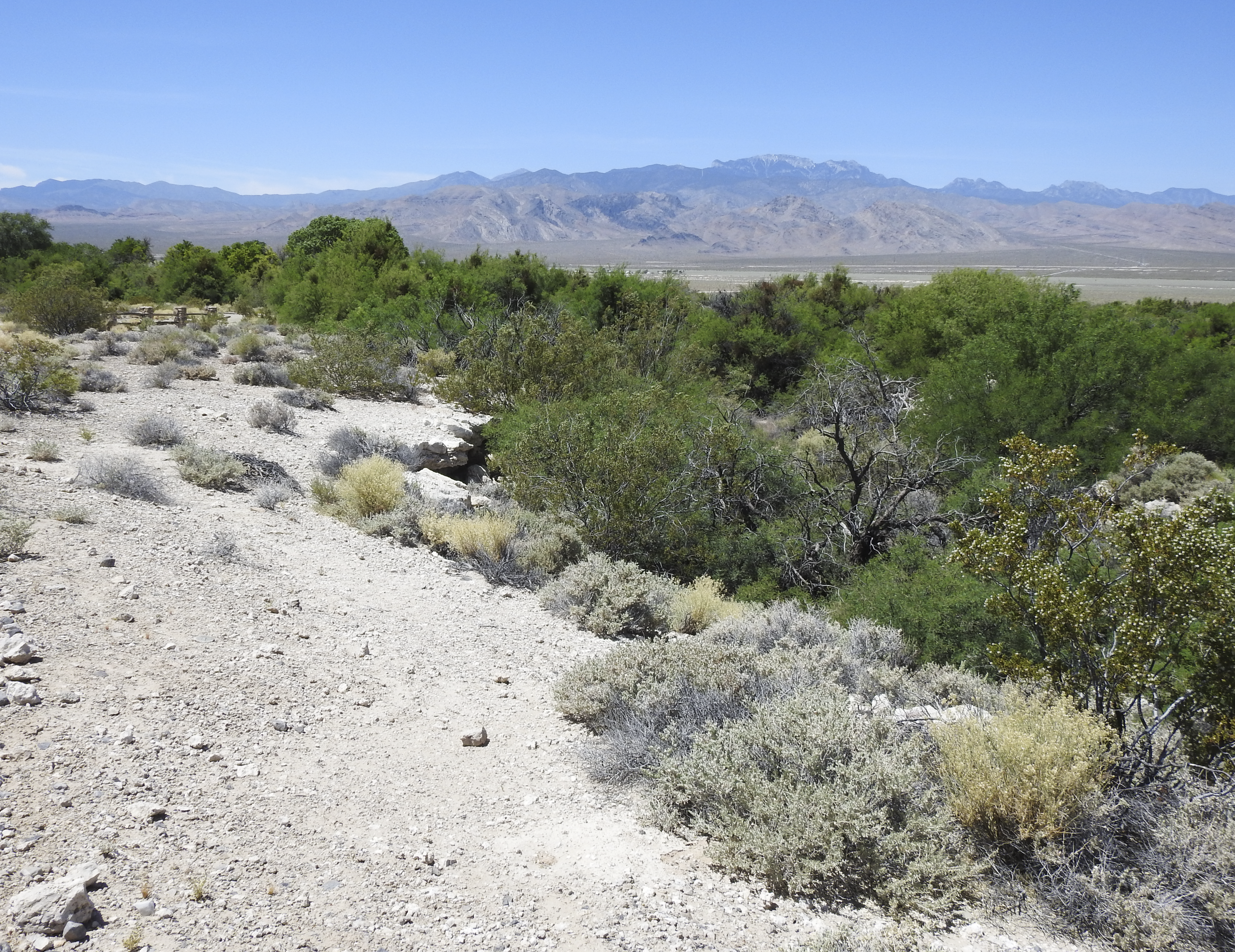
Looking west into the Mesquite Bosque at the DNR

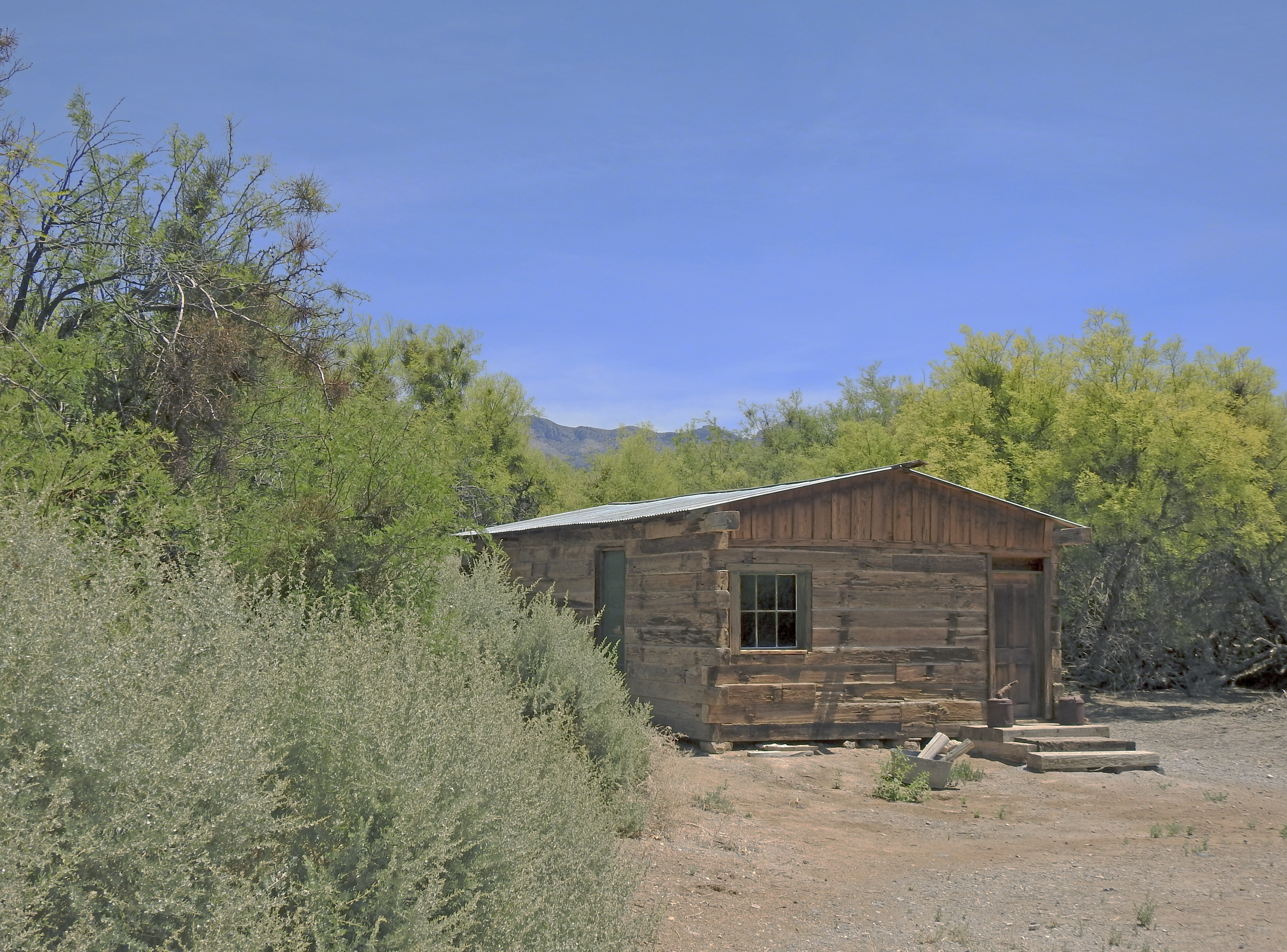
1920s Cabin Built of Railroad Ties in The Mesquite Bosque at the DNR

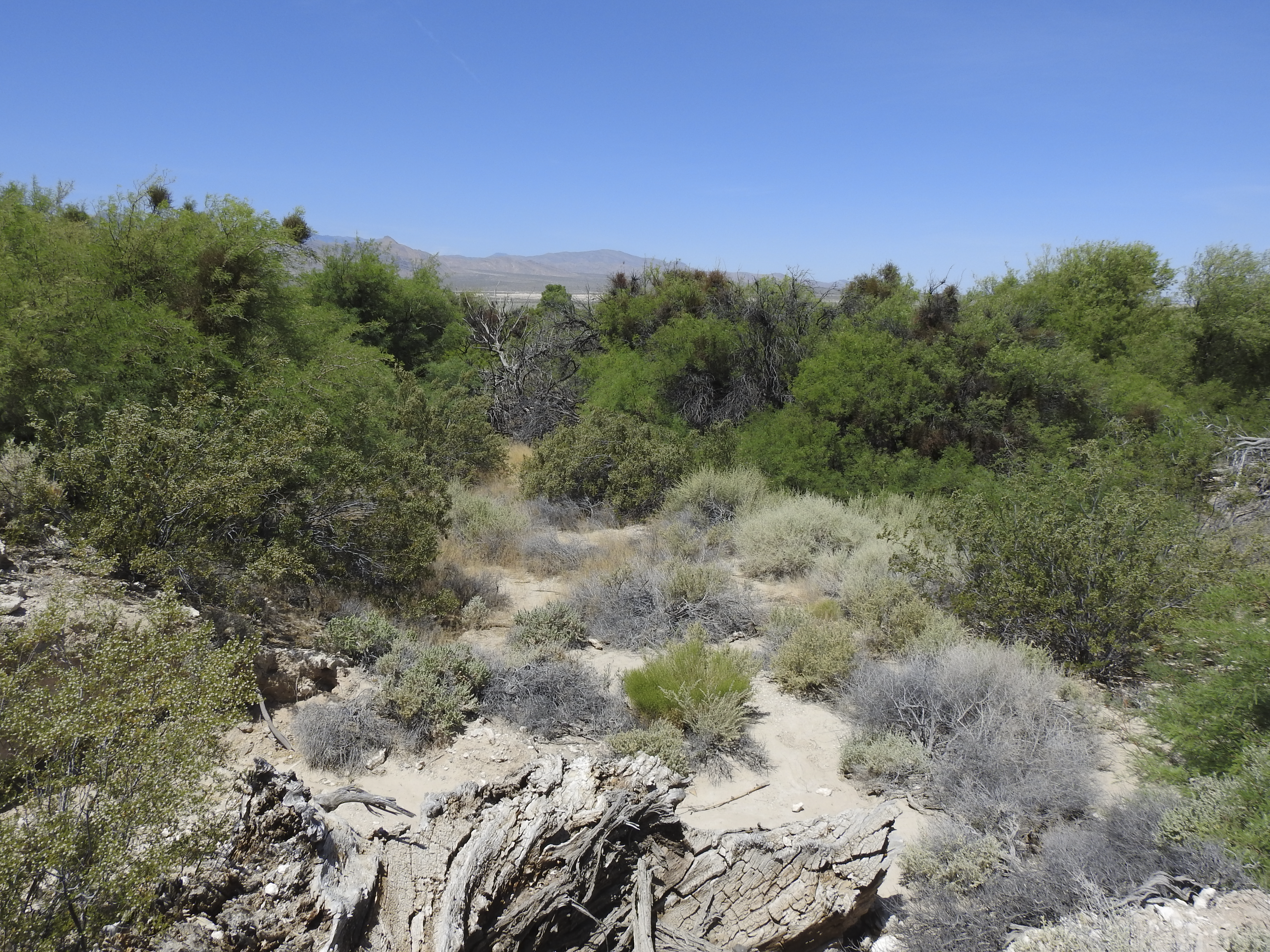
Northwest Looking View of the DNR Mesquite Bosque

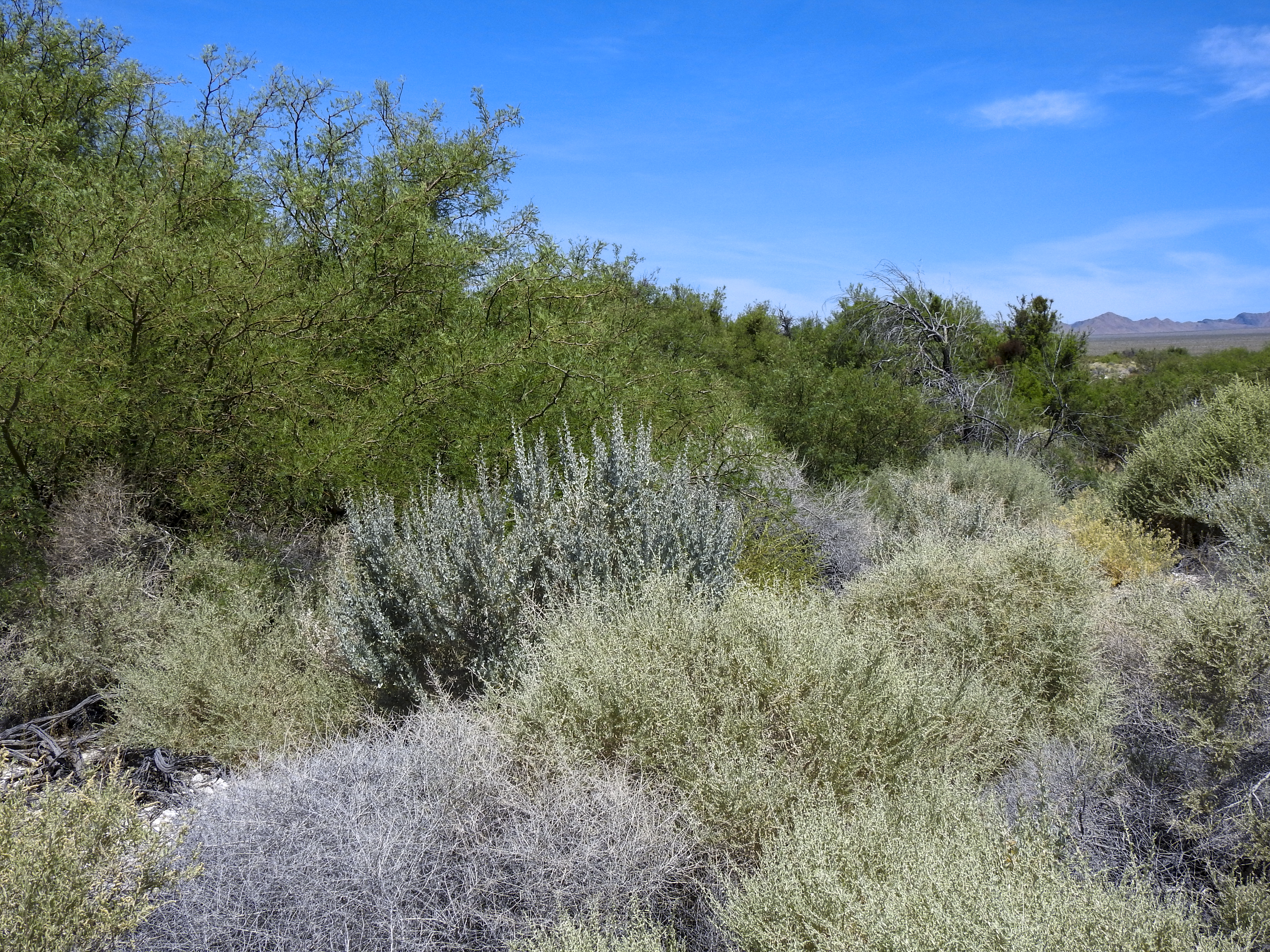
Bosque Interface With Sage

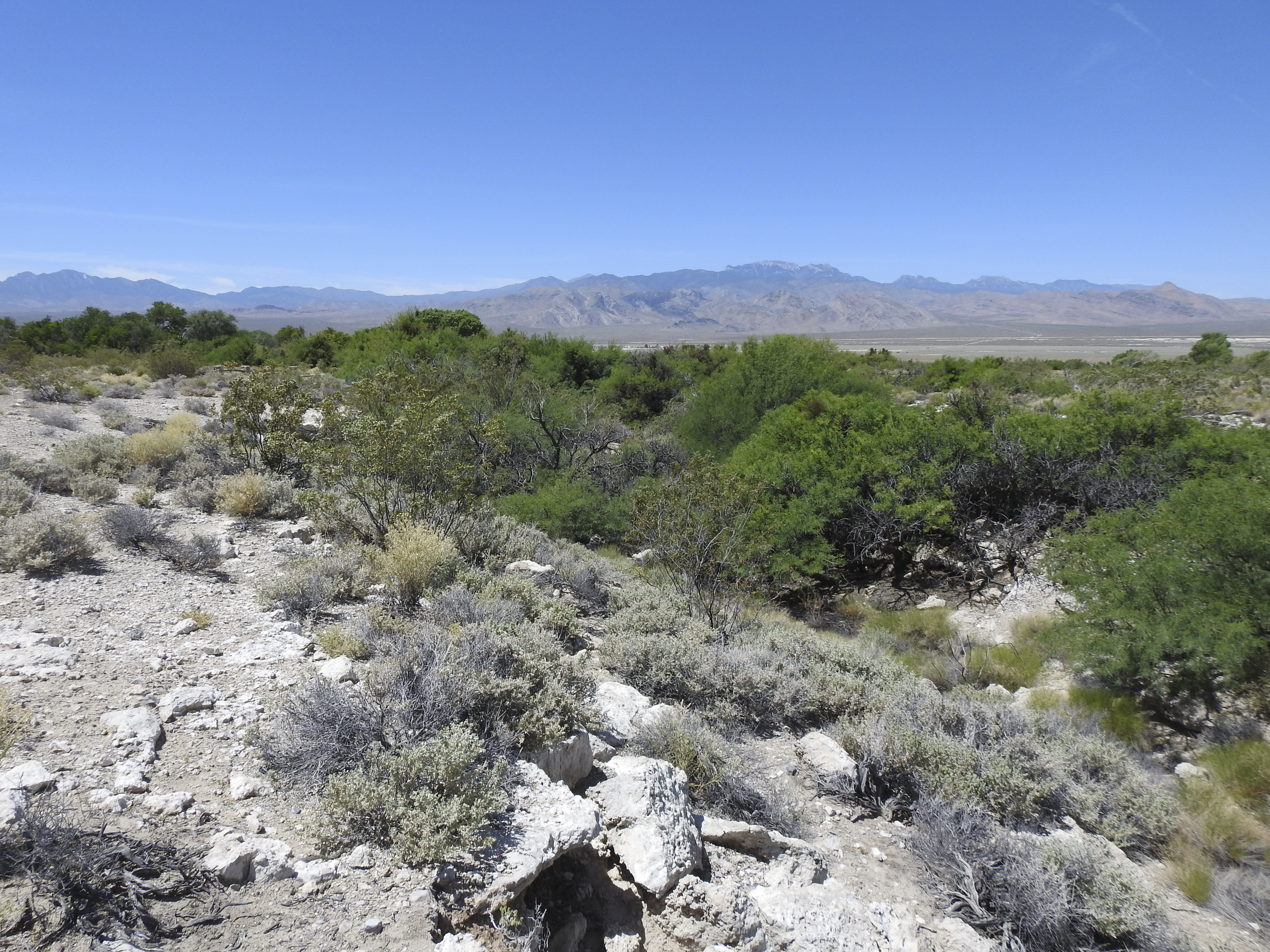
Westward look of the Mesquite Bosque at the DNR

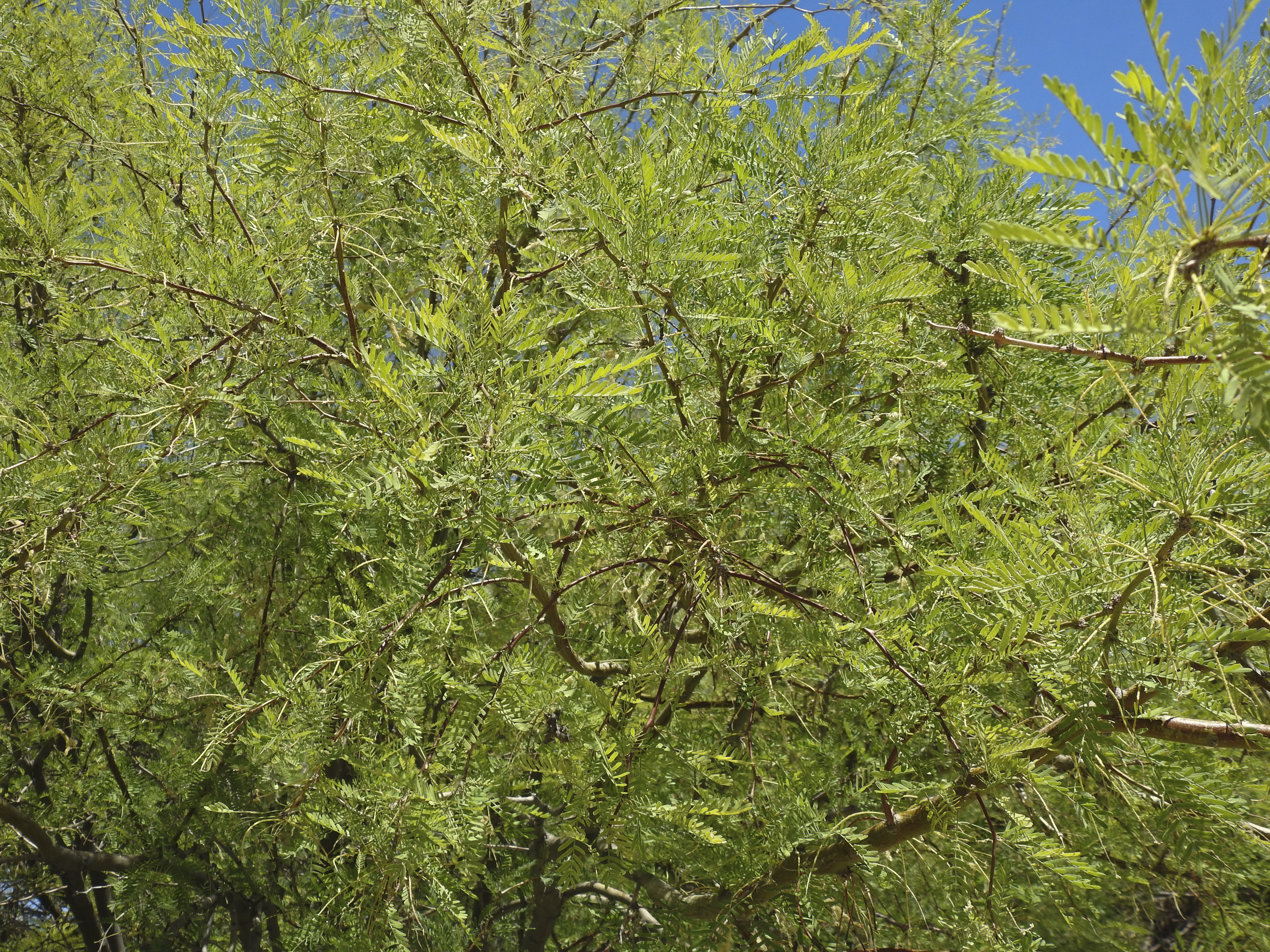
Branches of the Honey Mesquite in the Mesquite Bosque

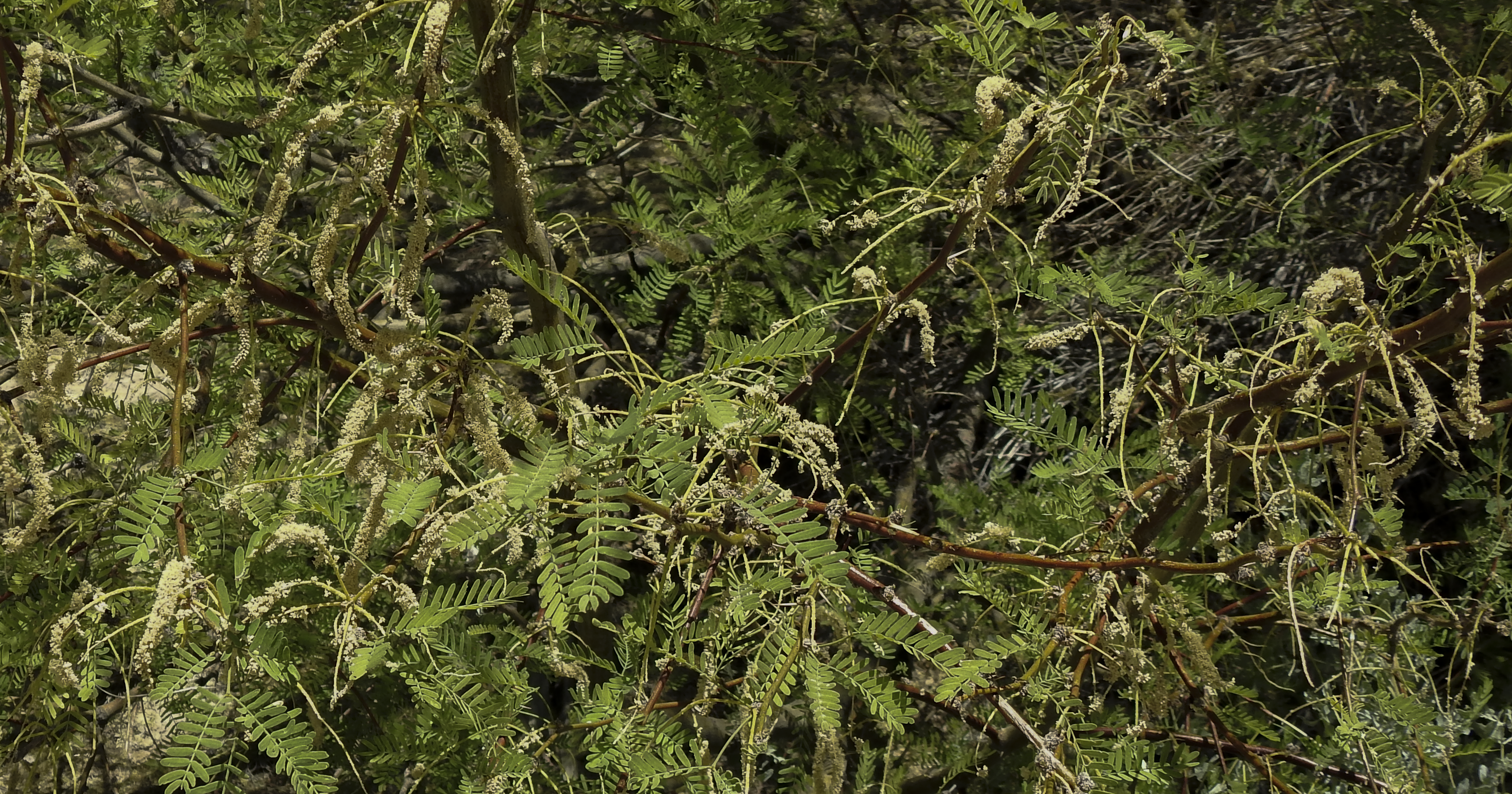
Honey Mesquite Flowers in the DBR's Mesquite Bosque

Mesquite Bosque at The Desert National Wildlife Refuge

Mesquite Bosque near the China Ranch Date Farm

== See also ==
- Bosque
- Tamaulipan mezquital
