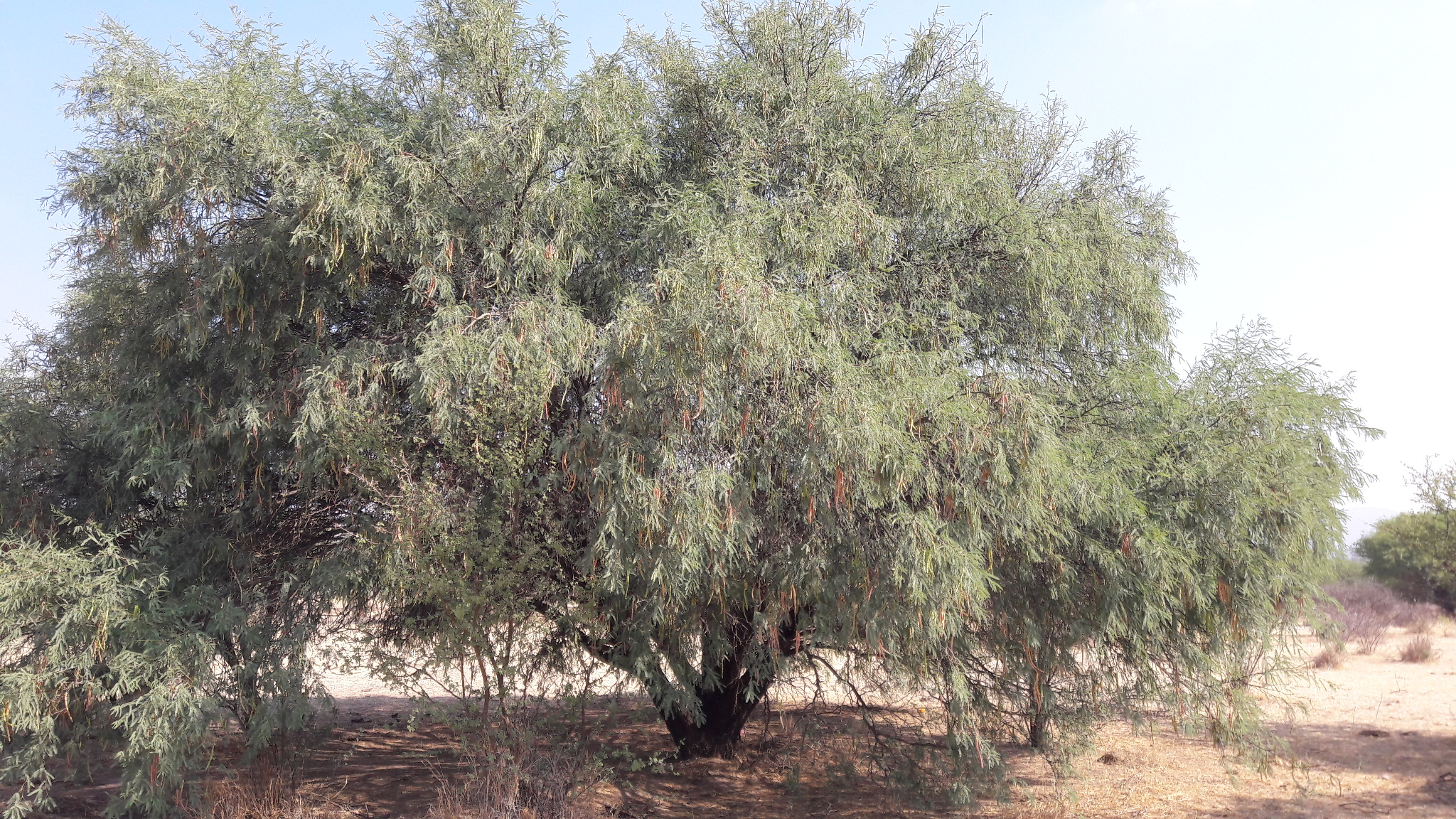

Conservation status
- Least Concern (IUCN 3.1)

Scientific classification
- Kingdom: Plantae
- Clade: Embryophytes
- Clade: Tracheophytes
- Clade: Angiosperms
- Clade: Eudicots
- Clade: Rosids
- Order: Fabales
- Family: Fabaceae
- Subfamily: Caesalpinioideae
- Clade: Mimosoid clade
- Genus: Neltuma
- Species: N. laevigata

Binomial name
- Neltuma laevigata (Humb. & Bonpl. ex Willd.) Britton & Rose

Synonyms
- Prosopis laevigata (Humb. & Bonpl. ex Willd.) M.C.Johnst.; Acacia laevigata Humb. & Bonpl. ex Willd.; Prosopis dulcis Kunth

= Neltuma laevigata =

Species of legume

Neltuma laevigata (formerly Prosopis laevigata), commonly known as smooth mesquite, is a species of flowering tree in the pea family, Fabaceae, that is native to Mexico and Texas. In Mexico, the species is found in the nation's the central highlands, the lowlands of southern Tamaulipas, and in parts of Oaxaca, Morelos, Puebla, and Chiapas. It grows on a variety of sites on hillslides, in depressions, and along floodplains. It has been spotted growing in the Middle East as well.

It is a known plant to the Aztecs recorded in the Libellus de Medicinalibus Indorum Herbis (as the quetzalmizquitl "precious mesquite").
