= Strombocarpa abbreviata =

Conservation status
- Least Concern (IUCN 3.1)

Scientific classification
- Kingdom: Plantae
- Clade: Tracheophytes
- Clade: Angiosperms
- Clade: Eudicots
- Clade: Rosids
- Order: Fabales
- Family: Fabaceae
- Subfamily: Caesalpinioideae
- Clade: Mimosoid clade
- Genus: Strombocarpa
- Species: S. abbreviata

Binomial name
- Strombocarpa abbreviata (Benth.) Hutch. ex C.E.Hughes & G.P.Lewis

Species of legume

Strombocarpa abbreviata, commonly known as the algarrobillo espinoso, is a species of flowering plant in the pea family, Fabaceae. It was previously known as Prosopis abbreviata.

The species is endemic to Argentina and found in semi-arid and arid areas scrubland. It is threatened by habitat loss.
