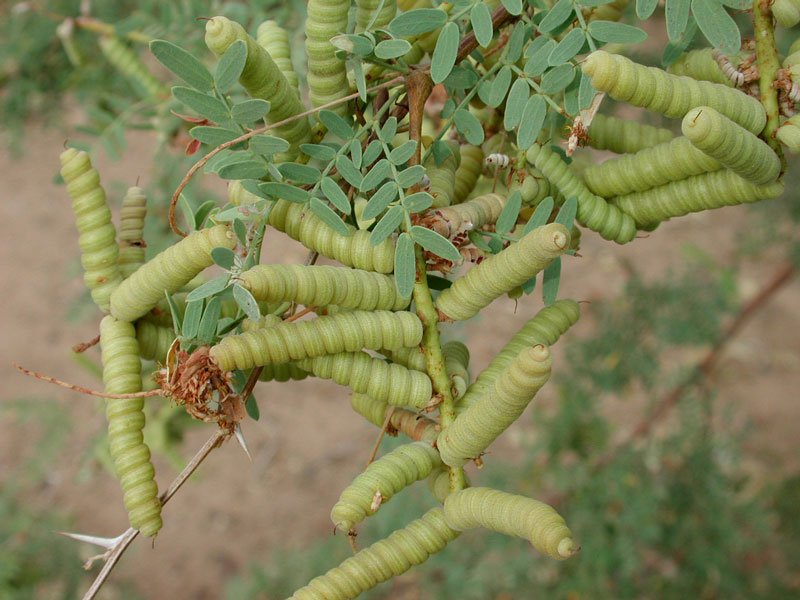
- Mature seedpods (legumes)

Scientific classification
- Kingdom: Plantae
- Clade: Tracheophytes
- Clade: Angiosperms
- Clade: Eudicots
- Clade: Rosids
- Order: Fabales
- Family: Fabaceae
- Subfamily: Caesalpinioideae
- Clade: Mimosoid clade
- Genus: Strombocarpa
- Species: S. pubescens

Binomial name
- Strombocarpa pubescens (Benth.) A.Gray
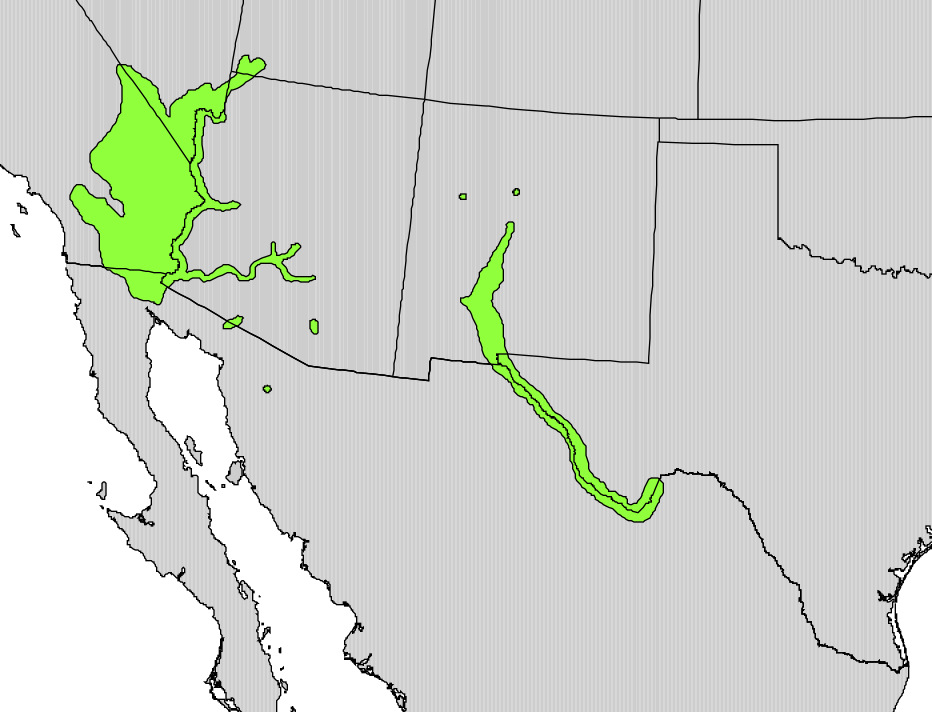
- Natural range

Synonyms
- Prosopis emoryi Torr.; Prosopis pubescens Benth.; Strombocarpa brevifolia Nutt. ex A.Gray

= Strombocarpa pubescens =

Species of tree

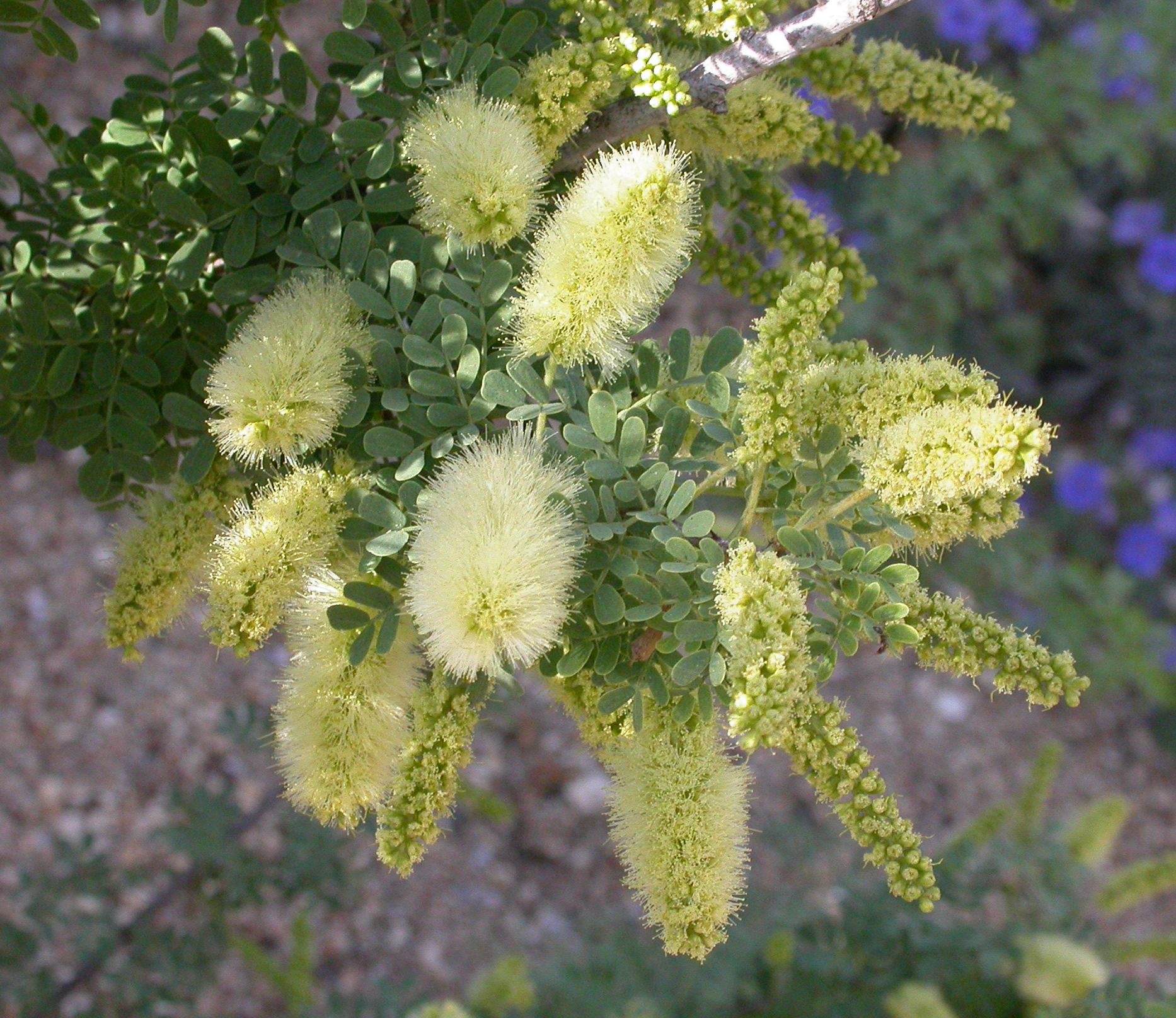
Flower spikes

Strombocarpa pubescens (formerly Prosopis pubescens), commonly known as screwbean mesquite, is a species of flowering shrub or small tree in the pea family, Fabaceae, that is native to the southwestern United States (Texas, Arizona, New Mexico, California, southern Nevada and Utah) and northern Mexico (Baja California, Chihuahua, Coahuila, Sonora).

== Description ==
This plant grows to about 7 m (23 ft). It has light brown bark, usually short, straight spines 1 to 3 centimeters long, twice-compound leaves, and numerous small yellowish flowers appearing in elongate spikes. The tightly twisted seedpods (legumes) are up to 5 centimeters long and very much resemble turned screws. This morphology may have been an evolutionary defense against seed predators such as bean weevils (Bruchinae). The seeds germinate after being scarified in the digestive tracts of animals that eat them. The plant also grows in a clockwise spiral.

== Habitat ==
It is found along streams and valleys in deserts, particularly in damp or saline soil. It grows alongside common plants of this habitat type, such as arrowweed (Pluchea sericea) and tamarisks. It can be found on playas and other areas of alkaline substrates. This and other mesquite species are dominant plants in the Mesquite Bosque-mesquite woodlands, a common habitat type in the desert southwest region.

Many types of animals readily eat the seedpods, including several bird and rodent species and coyotes. Many species of birds nest and roost in the trees, and small mammals find shelter in thicketlike stands.

== Uses ==
=== Food ===
Like those of other Strombocarpa, Neltuma and Prosopis species, Screwbean Mesquite has nutritious seedpods that can be eaten. The Pimas cooked the pods in dirt-covered pits over intervals of a few days. Mesquite is a traditional Native American food source, being used to make meal, cakes and syrup. Used as a staple food for centuries by desert dwellers, this high protein meal contains good quantities of calcium, magnesium, potassium, iron and zinc, and is rich in the amino acid lysine as well. Mesquite is high in fiber, moderate in sugar, and 8% protein. It has a sweet, rich, molasses-like flavor with a hint of caramel which blends well into smoothies or other drinks, especially those made with cacao and maca. The fruits may be used as a coffee substitute.

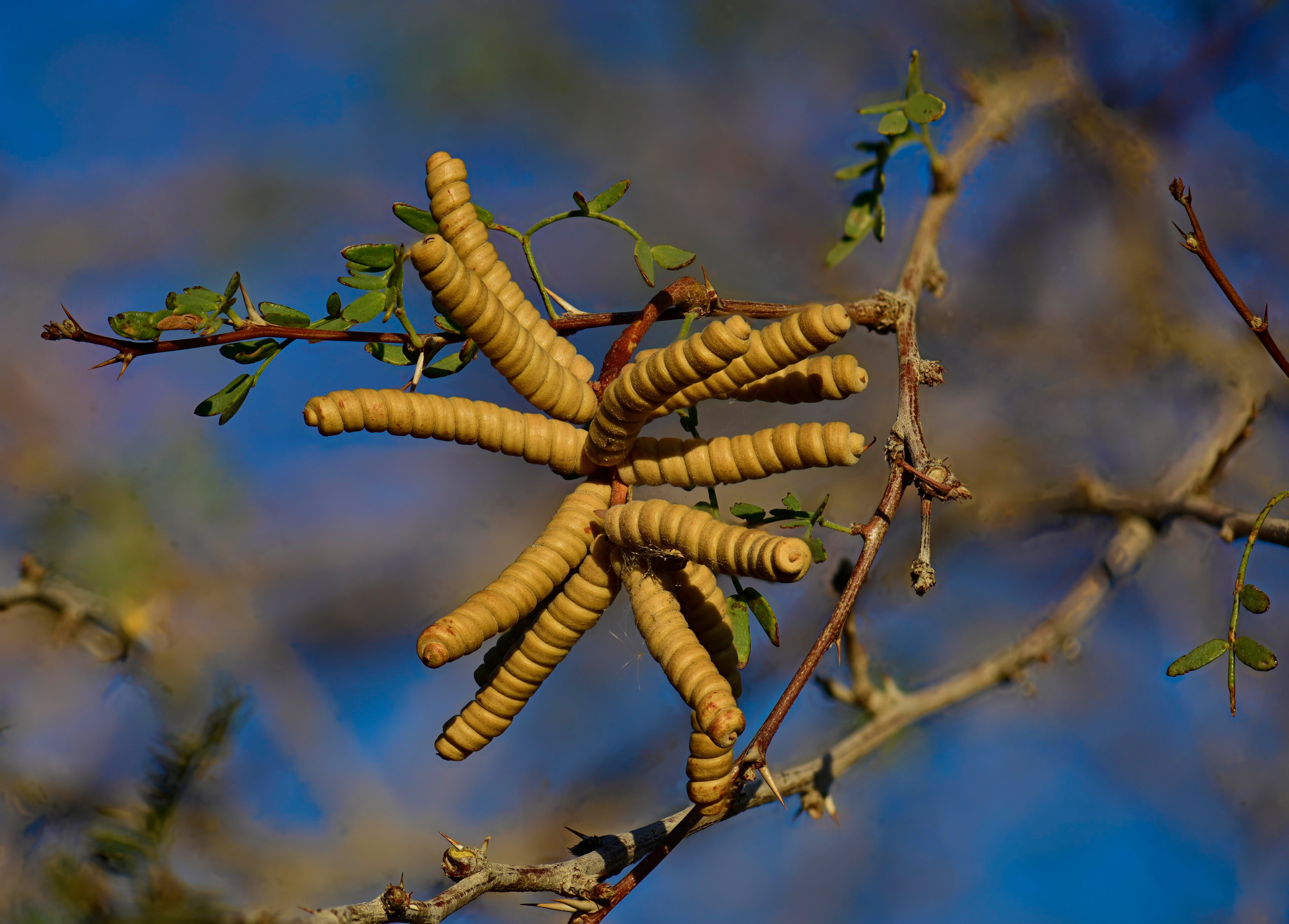
Dried seed pods

=== Wood ===
Native Americans found Screwbean wood valuable for building, for making tools and weapons, and as firewood. The wood is durable and considered attractive, and it may be used in woodworking. Some Native Americans also used the root bark to prepare a treatment for wounds.

== See also ==
- Mesquite Bosque
