= Oncideres boliviana =

Scientific classification
- Kingdom: Animalia
- Phylum: Arthropoda
- Class: Insecta
- Order: Coleoptera
- Suborder: Polyphaga
- Infraorder: Cucujiformia
- Family: Cerambycidae
- Genus: Oncideres
- Species: O. boliviana

Binomial name
- Oncideres boliviana Heyrovsky, 1952

Species of beetle

Oncideres boliviana is a species of beetle in the family Cerambycidae. It was described by Leopold Heyrovský in 1952. It is known from Bolivia.
