= Oncideres satyra =

Scientific classification
- Kingdom: Animalia
- Phylum: Arthropoda
- Class: Insecta
- Order: Coleoptera
- Suborder: Polyphaga
- Infraorder: Cucujiformia
- Family: Cerambycidae
- Genus: Oncideres
- Species: O. satyra

Binomial name
- Oncideres satyra Bates, 1865

Species of beetle

Oncideres satyra is a species of beetle in the family Cerambycidae. It was described by Henry Walter Bates in 1865. It is known from parts of South America, including Guyana, Suriname, French Guiana, Brazil, Peru and Bolivia.
