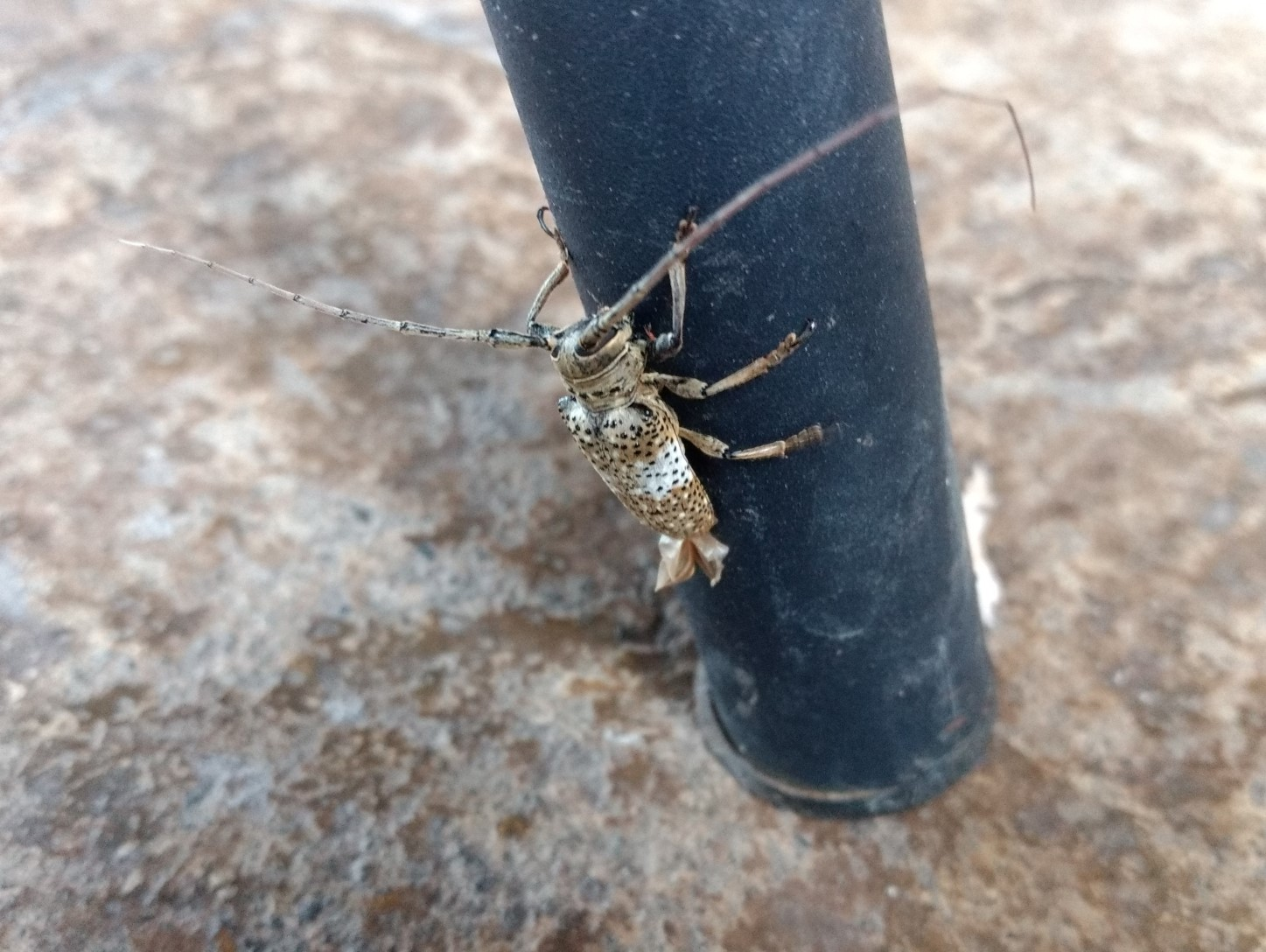

Scientific classification
- Kingdom: Animalia
- Phylum: Arthropoda
- Class: Insecta
- Order: Coleoptera
- Suborder: Polyphaga
- Infraorder: Cucujiformia
- Family: Cerambycidae
- Genus: Oncideres
- Species: O. punctata

Binomial name
- Oncideres punctata Dillon & Dillon, 1946

= Oncideres punctata =

Species of beetle

Oncideres punctata is a species of beetle in the family Cerambycidae. It was described by Dillon and Dillon in 1946. It is known from Costa Rica and Mexico.
