= Oncideres sparsemaculatus =

Scientific classification
- Kingdom: Animalia
- Phylum: Arthropoda
- Class: Insecta
- Order: Coleoptera
- Suborder: Polyphaga
- Infraorder: Cucujiformia
- Family: Cerambycidae
- Genus: Oncideres
- Species: O. sparsemaculatus

Binomial name
- Oncideres sparsemaculatus Martins & Galileo, 2010

Synonyms
- Oncideres sparsemaculata Martins & Galileo, 2010

Species of beetle

Oncideres sparsemaculatus is a species of beetle in the family Cerambycidae. It was described by Martins and Galileo in 2010. It is known from Guatemala.
