= Oncideres repandator =

Scientific classification
- Kingdom: Animalia
- Phylum: Arthropoda
- Clade: Pancrustacea
- Class: Insecta
- Order: Coleoptera
- Suborder: Polyphaga
- Infraorder: Cucujiformia
- Family: Cerambycidae
- Genus: Oncideres
- Species: O. repandator

Binomial name
- Oncideres repandator (Fabricius, 1792)

Species of beetle

Oncideres repandator is a species of beetle in the family Cerambycidae. It was described by Johan Christian Fabricius in 1792. It is known from French Guiana, Suriname, Brazil and Guyana. It feeds on Mangifera indica.
