= Oncideres stillata =

Scientific classification
- Kingdom: Animalia
- Phylum: Arthropoda
- Class: Insecta
- Order: Coleoptera
- Suborder: Polyphaga
- Infraorder: Cucujiformia
- Family: Cerambycidae
- Genus: Oncideres
- Species: O. stillata

Binomial name
- Oncideres stillata Aurivillius, 1904

Species of beetle

Oncideres stillata is a species of beetle in the family Cerambycidae. It was described by Per Olof Christopher Aurivillius in 1904 and is known from Bolivia.
