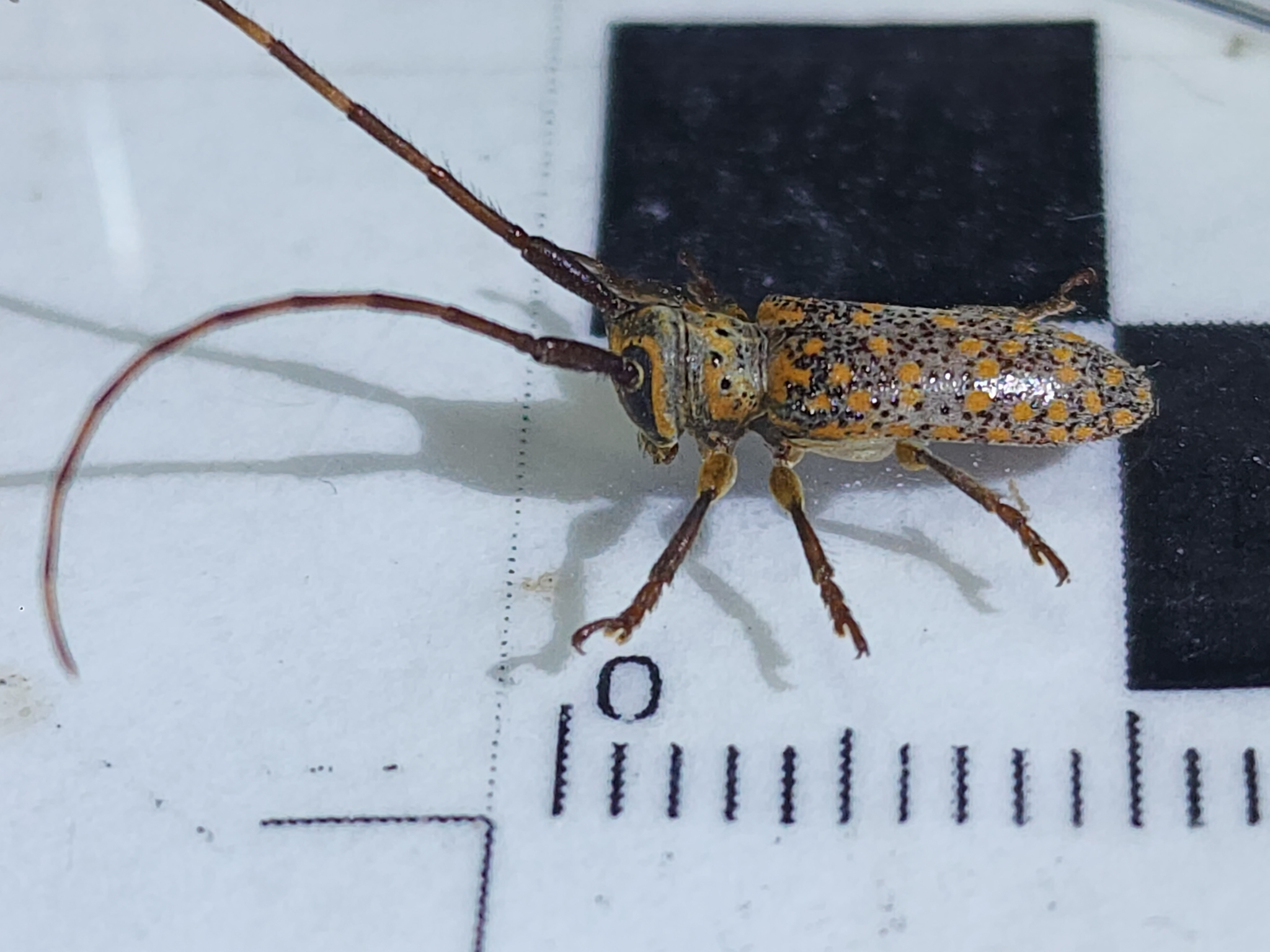

Scientific classification
- Kingdom: Animalia
- Phylum: Arthropoda
- Class: Insecta
- Order: Coleoptera
- Suborder: Polyphaga
- Infraorder: Cucujiformia
- Family: Cerambycidae
- Genus: Oncideres
- Species: O. schreiteri

Binomial name
- Oncideres schreiteri Bruch, 1941

= Oncideres schreiteri =

Species of beetle

Oncideres schreiteri is a species of beetle in the family Cerambycidae. It was described by Bruch in 1941 and is known from Argentina.
