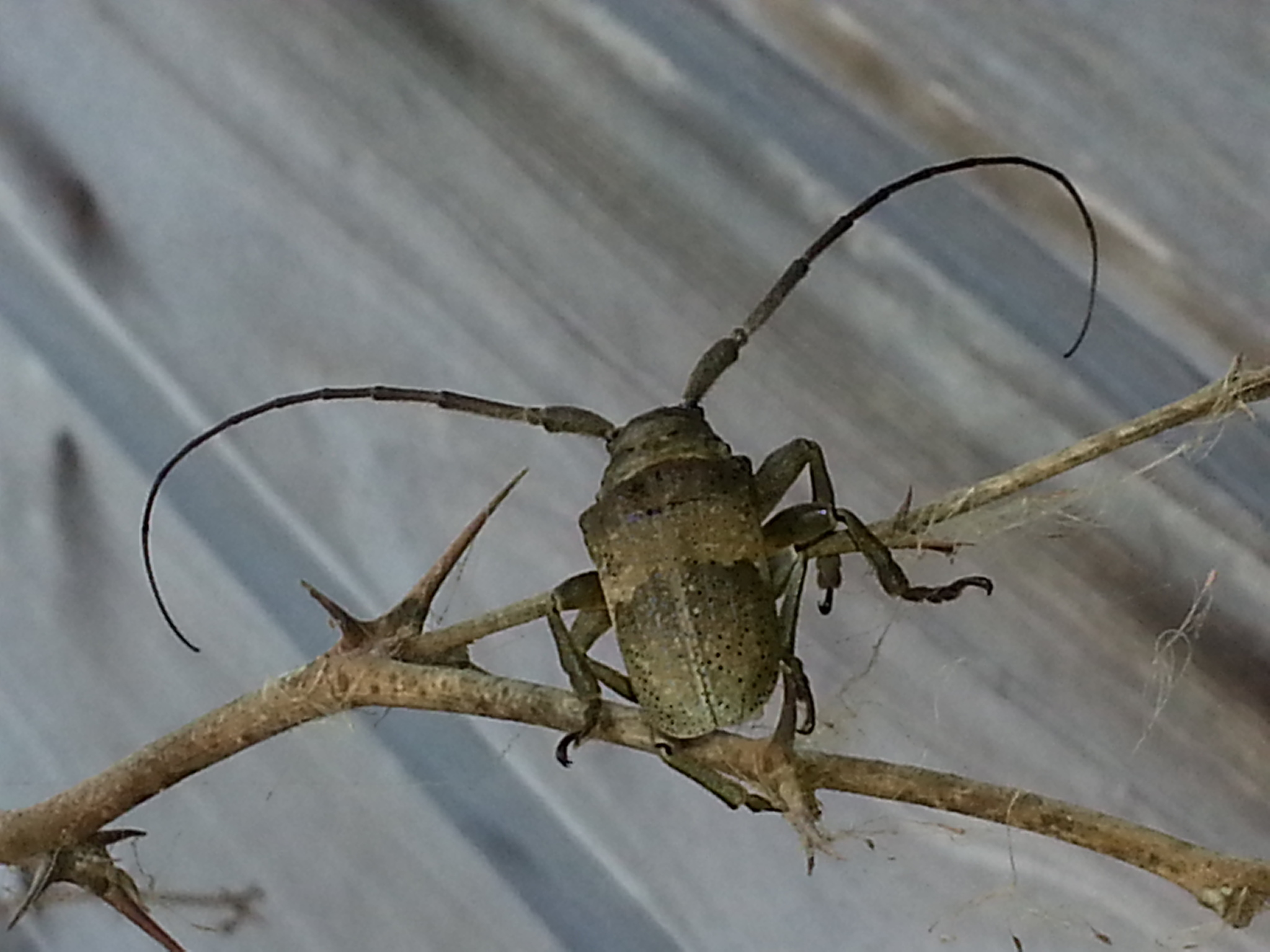

Scientific classification
- Kingdom: Animalia
- Phylum: Arthropoda
- Class: Insecta
- Order: Coleoptera
- Suborder: Polyphaga
- Infraorder: Cucujiformia
- Family: Cerambycidae
- Genus: Oncideres
- Species: O. pustulata

Binomial name
- Oncideres pustulata LeConte, 1854

= Oncideres pustulata =

Species of beetle

Oncideres pustulata is a species of beetle in the family Cerambycidae. It was described by John Lawrence LeConte in 1854. It is known from Mexico and the United States. It feeds on Leucaena leucocephala, Leucaena pulverulenta, Prosopis alba, and Prosopis chilensis.
