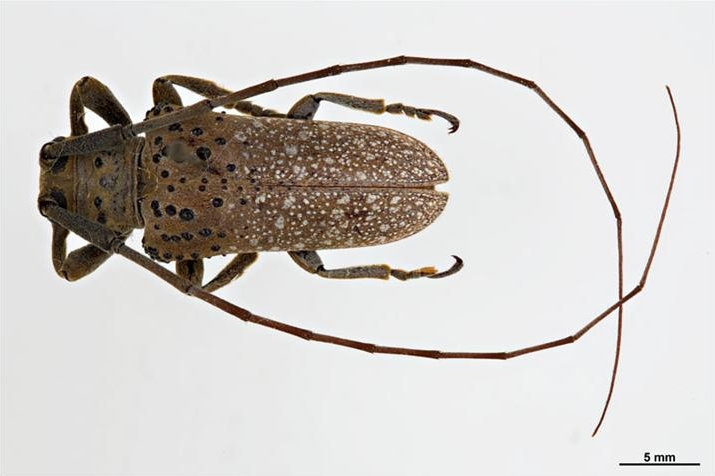
- Oncideres captiosa

Scientific classification
- Kingdom: Animalia
- Phylum: Arthropoda
- Class: Insecta
- Order: Coleoptera
- Suborder: Polyphaga
- Infraorder: Cucujiformia
- Family: Cerambycidae
- Subfamily: Lamiinae
- Tribe: Onciderini
- Genus: Oncideres; Lacordaire, 1830

= Oncideres =

Genus of beetles

Oncideres is a genus of longhorn beetles of the subfamily Lamiinae, containing more than 120 species in the nearctic and neotropics.

== Species ==
- Oncideres albipilosa Noguera, 1993
- Oncideres albistillata Dillon & Dillon, 1952
- Oncideres albomaculata Dillon & Dillon, 1946
- Oncideres albomarginata Thomson, 1868
- Oncideres albopicta Martins & Galileo, 1990
- Oncideres alicei Lane, 1977
- Oncideres amo Galileo & Martins, 2008
- Oncideres amputator (Fabricius, 1792)
- Oncideres anama Galileo & Martins, 2010
- Oncideres angaturama Galileo & Martins, 2008
- Oncideres apiaba Martins, 1981
- Oncideres apicalis Dillon & Dillon, 1946
- Oncideres aragua Martins & Galileo, 1990
- Oncideres argentata Dillon & Dillon, 1946
- Oncideres aurivillii Galileo & Martins, 2011
- Oncideres bella Martins & Galileo, 1999
- Oncideres boliviana Heyrovsky, 1952
- Oncideres bondari Melzer, 1923
- Oncideres bouchardi Bates, 1865
- Oncideres bucki Melzer, 1934
- Oncideres canidia Dillon & Dillon, 1946
- Oncideres captiosa Martins, 1981
- Oncideres castanea Dillon & Dillon, 1946
- Oncideres cephalotes Bates, 1865
- Oncideres cervina Thomson, 1868
- Oncideres chagasi Martins, 1981
- Oncideres chevrolatii Thomson, 1868
- Oncideres cingulata (Say, 1826) - Twig Girdler
- Oncideres coites Martins, Galileo & de Oliveira, 2009
- Oncideres colombiana Dillon & Dillon, 1946
- Oncideres crassicornis Bates, 1865
- Oncideres cumdisci Noguera, 1993
- Oncideres dalmani Thomson, 1868
- Oncideres defectiofasciata Gilmour, 1950
- Oncideres dejeanii Thomson, 1868
- Oncideres diana (Olivier, 1792)
- Oncideres digna Bates, 1865
- Oncideres diringsi Martins & Galileo, 1990
- Oncideres disiunctus Galileo & Martins, 2011
- Oncideres dorsomaculata Noguera, 1993
- Oncideres errata Martins & Galileo, 2009
- Oncideres estebani Martins & Galileo, 2010
- Oncideres etiolata Dillon & Dillon, 1946
- Oncideres fabricii Thomson, 1868
- Oncideres fisheri Dillon & Dillon, 1946
- Oncideres fulva Bates, 1865
- Oncideres fulvoguttata Dillon & Dillon, 1946
- Oncideres fulvostillata Bates, 1872
- Oncideres gemmata Dillon & Dillon, 1946
- Oncideres germarii Thomson, 1868
- Oncideres gibbosa Thomson, 1868
- Oncideres glebulenta Martins, 1981
- Oncideres guttulata Thomson, 1868
- Oncideres gutturator (Fabricius, 1775)
- Oncideres hoffmanni Galileo & Martins, 2008
- Oncideres humeralis Thomson, 1868
- Oncideres ilaire Dillon & Dillon, 1946
- Oncideres immensa Martins & Galileo, 2009
- Oncideres impluviata (Germar, 1842)
- Oncideres intermedia Dillon & Dillon, 1946
- Oncideres irrorata Melzer, 1934
- Oncideres jatai Bondar, 1953
- Oncideres laceyi Dillon & Dillon, 1949
- Oncideres limpida Bates, 1865
- Oncideres lyside Dillon & Dillon, 1949
- Oncideres macra Thomson, 1868
- Oncideres maculosus Redtenbacher, 1868
- Oncideres magnifica Martins, 1981
- Oncideres malleri Fragoso, 1970
- Oncideres manauara Martins & Galileo, 1995
- Oncideres maxima Dillon & Dillon, 1946
- Oncideres miliaris (Schönherr, 1817)
- Oncideres miniata Thomson, 1868
- Oncideres minuta Thomson, 1868
- Oncideres mirador Martins, Galileo & de Oliveira, 2009
- Oncideres mirim Martins & Galileo, 1996
- Oncideres modesta Dillon & Dillon, 1946
- Oncideres multicincta Dillon & Dillon, 1946
- Oncideres nicea Dillon & Dillon, 1949
- Oncideres nipheta Martins, 1981
- Oncideres nivea Dillon & Dillon, 1946
- Oncideres ocellaris Bates, 1885
- Oncideres ochreostillata Dillon & Dillon, 1952
- Oncideres ocularis Thomson, 1868
- Oncideres ophthalmalis Dillon & Dillon, 1946
- Oncideres pallifasciata Noguera, 1993
- Oncideres paurosoma Noguera, 1993
- Oncideres pectoralis Thomson, 1868
- Oncideres pepotinga Martins, 1981
- Oncideres phaetusa Dillon & Dillon, 1946
- Oncideres philosipes Dillon & Dillon, 1946
- Oncideres pittieri Gahan, 1894
- Oncideres poecila Bates, 1880
- Oncideres poeta Dillon & Dillon, 1949
- Oncideres polychroma Dillon & Dillon, 1946
- Oncideres pretiosa Martins & Galileo, 1990
- Oncideres pulchella Bates, 1865
- Oncideres punctata Dillon & Dillon, 1946
- Oncideres pustulata LeConte, 1854
- Oncideres putator Thomson, 1868
- Oncideres pyrrothrix Noguera, 1993
- Oncideres quercus Skinner, 1905
- Oncideres repandator (Fabricius, 1792)
- Oncideres rhodosticta Bates, 1885
- Oncideres rubra Franz, 1959
- Oncideres saga (Dalman, 1823)
- Oncideres satyra Bates, 1865
- Oncideres schreiteri Bruch, 1941
- Oncideres scitula Bates, 1880
- Oncideres seabrai Fragoso, 1970
- Oncideres senilis Bates, 1885
- Oncideres sobrina Dillon & Dillon, 1946
- Oncideres sparsemaculatus Martins & Galileo, 2010
- Oncideres stillata Aurivillius, 1904
- Oncideres travassosi Fragoso, 1970
- Oncideres tuberculata Thomson, 1868
- Oncideres tuberosa Martins & Galileo, 2006
- Oncideres ulcerosa (Germar, 1824)
- Oncideres vicina Thomson, 1868
- Oncideres vitiliga Martins, 1981
- Oncideres voetii Thomson, 1868
- Oncideres wappesi Martins & Galileo, 2005
- Oncideres xavieri Galileo & Martins, 2010
