= Oncideres scitula =

Scientific classification
- Kingdom: Animalia
- Phylum: Arthropoda
- Class: Insecta
- Order: Coleoptera
- Suborder: Polyphaga
- Infraorder: Cucujiformia
- Family: Cerambycidae
- Genus: Oncideres
- Species: O. scitula

Binomial name
- Oncideres scitula Bates, 1880

Species of beetle

Oncideres scitula is a species of beetle in the family Cerambycidae. It was described by Henry Walter Bates in 1880. It is known from Mexico.
