= Oncideres xavieri =

Scientific classification
- Kingdom: Animalia
- Phylum: Arthropoda
- Class: Insecta
- Order: Coleoptera
- Suborder: Polyphaga
- Infraorder: Cucujiformia
- Family: Cerambycidae
- Genus: Oncideres
- Species: O. xavieri

Binomial name
- Oncideres xavieri Galileo & Martins, 2010

Species of beetle

Oncideres xavieri is a species of beetle in the family Cerambycidae. It was described by Galileo and Martins in 2010.
