= Oncideres amputator =

Scientific classification
- Kingdom: Animalia
- Phylum: Arthropoda
- Clade: Pancrustacea
- Class: Insecta
- Order: Coleoptera
- Suborder: Polyphaga
- Infraorder: Cucujiformia
- Family: Cerambycidae
- Genus: Oncideres
- Species: O. amputator

Binomial name
- Oncideres amputator (Fabricius, 1792)

Synonyms
- Lamia amputator Fabricius, 1792; Oncideres lherminieri Forsstrom in Schönherr, 1824; Saperda amputator (Fabricius) Lucas, 1839

Species of beetle

Oncideres amputator is a species of beetle in the family Cerambycidae. It was described by Johan Christian Fabricius in 1792, originally under the genus Lamia. It is known from the Caribbean Islands. It feeds on Eucalyptus and Inga ingoides.
