= Oncideres aurivillii =

Scientific classification
- Kingdom: Animalia
- Phylum: Arthropoda
- Class: Insecta
- Order: Coleoptera
- Suborder: Polyphaga
- Infraorder: Cucujiformia
- Family: Cerambycidae
- Genus: Oncideres
- Species: O. aurivillii

Binomial name
- Oncideres aurivillii Galileo & Martins, 2011

Synonyms
- Oncideres stillata Galileo & Martins, 2010 nec Aurivillius, 1904

Species of beetle

Oncideres aurivillii is a species of beetle in the family Cerambycidae. It was described by Galileo and Martins in 2011.
