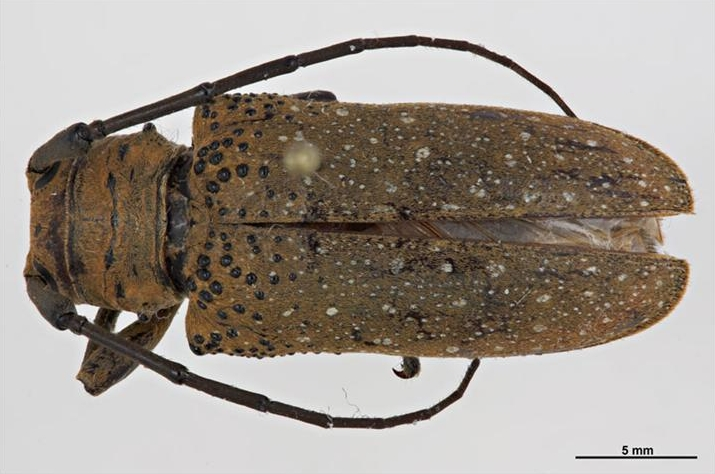

Scientific classification
- Kingdom: Animalia
- Phylum: Arthropoda
- Class: Insecta
- Order: Coleoptera
- Suborder: Polyphaga
- Infraorder: Cucujiformia
- Family: Cerambycidae
- Genus: Oncideres
- Species: O. gutturator

Binomial name
- Oncideres gutturator (Fabricius, 1775)

Synonyms
- Lamia gutturator Fabricius, 1775; Oncideres saga amazona Dillon & Dillon, 1946

= Oncideres gutturator =

Species of beetle

Oncideres gutturator is a species of beetle in the family Cerambycidae. It was described by Johan Christian Fabricius in 1775. It is known from Ecuador, Brazil, Guyana, Suriname, Panama, and French Guiana.
