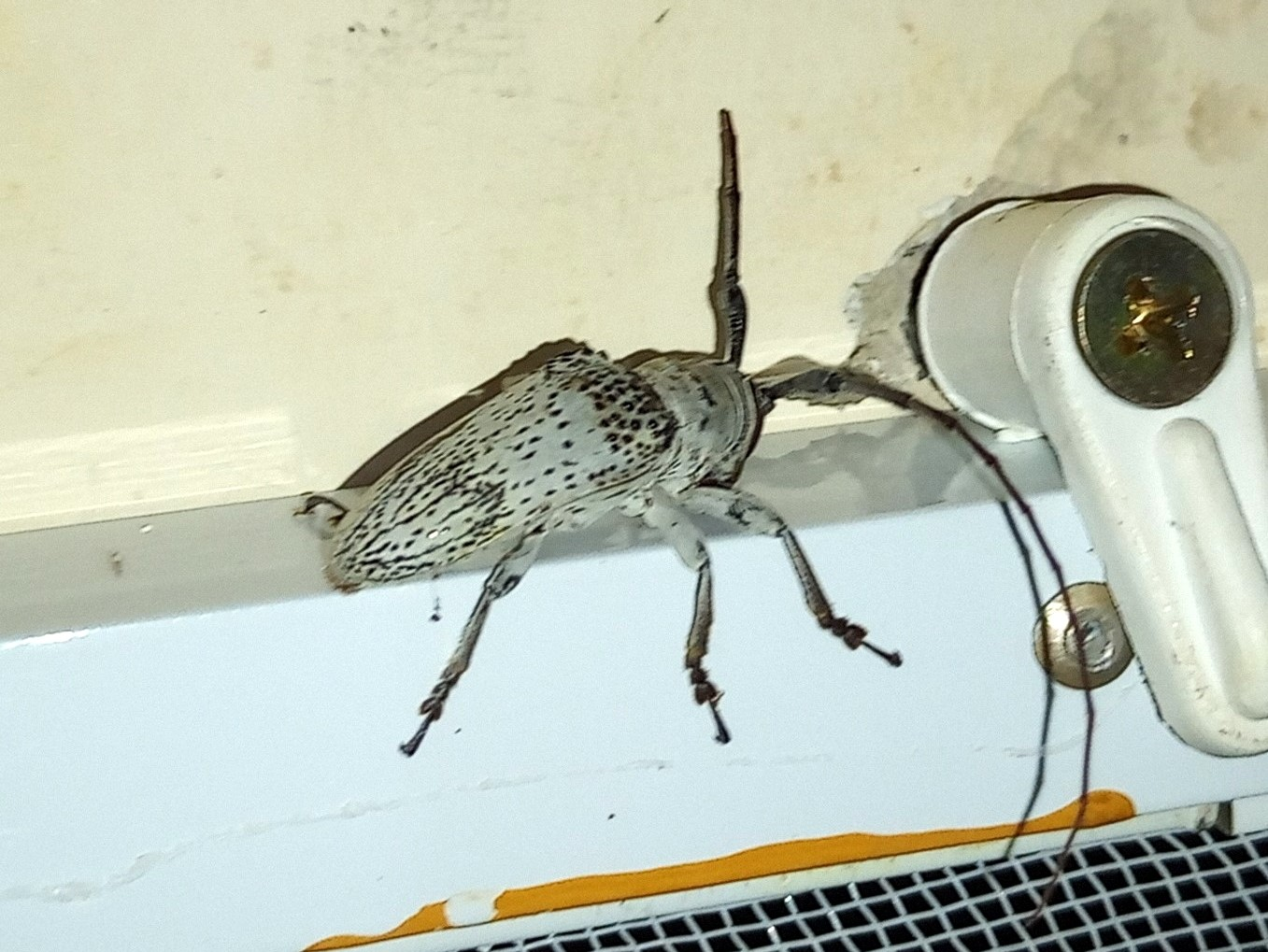

Scientific classification
- Kingdom: Animalia
- Phylum: Arthropoda
- Clade: Pancrustacea
- Class: Insecta
- Order: Coleoptera
- Suborder: Polyphaga
- Infraorder: Cucujiformia
- Family: Cerambycidae
- Genus: Oncideres
- Species: O. errata

Binomial name
- Oncideres errata Martins & Galileo, 2009

= Oncideres errata =

Species of beetle

Oncideres errata is a species of beetle in the family Cerambycidae. It was first described by Martins and Galileo in 2009. It is known from Brazil.
