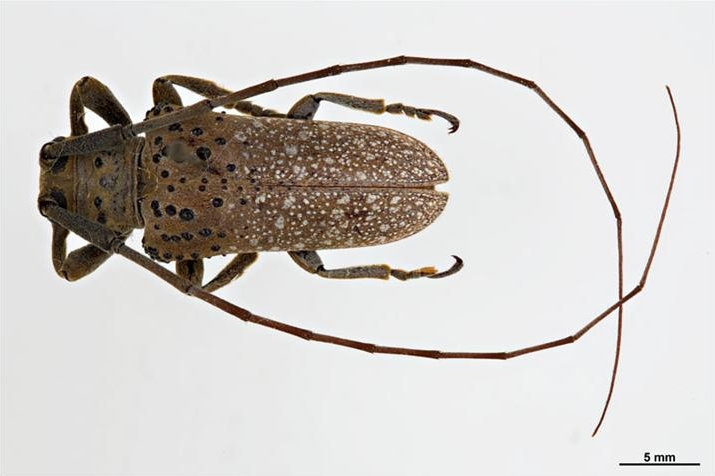

Scientific classification
- Kingdom: Animalia
- Phylum: Arthropoda
- Class: Insecta
- Order: Coleoptera
- Suborder: Polyphaga
- Infraorder: Cucujiformia
- Family: Cerambycidae
- Genus: Oncideres
- Species: O. captiosa

Binomial name
- Oncideres captiosa Martins, 1981

Synonyms
- Oncideres aegrota (Thomson) Fonseca, 1931

= Oncideres captiosa =

Species of beetle

Oncideres captiosa is a species of beetle in the family Cerambycidae. It was described by Martins in 1981. It is known from Paraguay and Brazil.
