= Oncideres senilis =

Scientific classification
- Kingdom: Animalia
- Phylum: Arthropoda
- Class: Insecta
- Order: Coleoptera
- Suborder: Polyphaga
- Infraorder: Cucujiformia
- Family: Cerambycidae
- Genus: Oncideres
- Species: O. senilis

Binomial name
- Oncideres senilis Bates, 1885

Species of beetle

Oncideres senilis is a species of beetle in the family Cerambycidae. It was described by Henry Walter Bates in 1885. It is known from Nicaragua and Mexico.
