= Oncideres irrorata =

Scientific classification
- Kingdom: Animalia
- Phylum: Arthropoda
- Class: Insecta
- Order: Coleoptera
- Suborder: Polyphaga
- Infraorder: Cucujiformia
- Family: Cerambycidae
- Genus: Oncideres
- Species: O. irrorata

Binomial name
- Oncideres irrorata Melzer, 1934

Species of beetle

Oncideres irrorata is a species of beetle in the family Cerambycidae. It was described by Melzer in 1934. It is known from Brazil.
