= Oncideres diana =

Scientific classification
- Kingdom: Animalia
- Phylum: Arthropoda
- Clade: Pancrustacea
- Class: Insecta
- Order: Coleoptera
- Suborder: Polyphaga
- Infraorder: Cucujiformia
- Family: Cerambycidae
- Genus: Oncideres
- Species: O. diana

Binomial name
- Oncideres diana (Olivier, 1792)

Species of beetle

Oncideres diana is a species of beetle in the family Cerambycidae. It was described by Guillaume-Antoine Olivier in 1792. It is known from Brazil and French Guiana.
