= Oncideres miniata =

Scientific classification
- Kingdom: Animalia
- Phylum: Arthropoda
- Class: Insecta
- Order: Coleoptera
- Suborder: Polyphaga
- Infraorder: Cucujiformia
- Family: Cerambycidae
- Genus: Oncideres
- Species: O. miniata

Binomial name
- Oncideres miniata Thomson, 1868

Species of beetle

Oncideres miniata is a species of beetle in the family Cerambycidae. It was described by James Thomson in 1868. It is known from Paraguay, Argentina and Brazil.
