= Oncideres maculosus =

Scientific classification
- Kingdom: Animalia
- Phylum: Arthropoda
- Class: Insecta
- Order: Coleoptera
- Suborder: Polyphaga
- Infraorder: Cucujiformia
- Family: Cerambycidae
- Genus: Oncideres
- Species: O. maculosus

Binomial name
- Oncideres maculosus Redtenbacher, 1868

Synonyms
- Oncideres maculosa Redtenbacher, 1867

Species of beetle

Oncideres maculosus is a species of beetle in the family Cerambycidae native to Brazil. It was described by Redtenbacher in 1868.
