= Oncideres pyrrothrix =

Scientific classification
- Kingdom: Animalia
- Phylum: Arthropoda
- Class: Insecta
- Order: Coleoptera
- Suborder: Polyphaga
- Infraorder: Cucujiformia
- Family: Cerambycidae
- Genus: Oncideres
- Species: O. pyrrothrix

Binomial name
- Oncideres pyrrothrix Noguera, 1993

Species of beetle

Oncideres pyrrothrix is a species of beetle in the family Cerambycidae. It was described by Noguera in 1993. It is known from Mexico.
