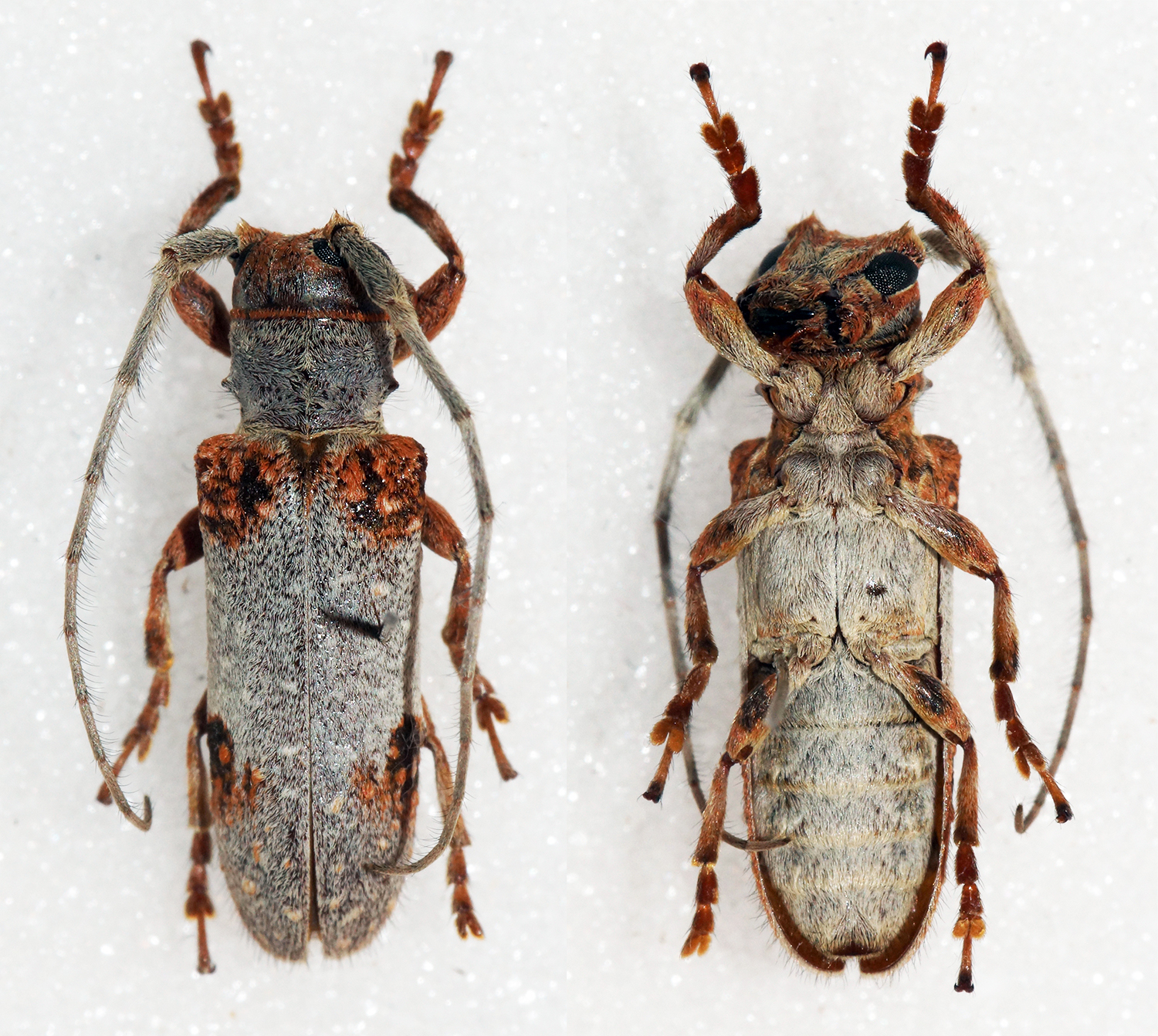

Scientific classification
- Kingdom: Animalia
- Phylum: Arthropoda
- Class: Insecta
- Order: Coleoptera
- Suborder: Polyphaga
- Infraorder: Cucujiformia
- Family: Cerambycidae
- Genus: Oncideres
- Species: O. quercus

Binomial name
- Oncideres quercus Skinner, 1905

= Oncideres quercus =

Species of beetle

Oncideres quercus is a species of beetle in the family Cerambycidae. It was described by Skinner in 1905. It is known from Mexico and the United States.
