= Oncideres rubra =

Scientific classification
- Kingdom: Animalia
- Phylum: Arthropoda
- Class: Insecta
- Order: Coleoptera
- Suborder: Polyphaga
- Infraorder: Cucujiformia
- Family: Cerambycidae
- Genus: Oncideres
- Species: O. rubra

Binomial name
- Oncideres rubra Franz, 1959

Species of beetle

Oncideres rubra is a species of beetle in the family Cerambycidae. It was described by Franz in 1959. It is known from Costa Rica and Mexico.
