= Oncideres alicei =

Scientific classification
- Kingdom: Animalia
- Phylum: Arthropoda
- Class: Insecta
- Order: Coleoptera
- Suborder: Polyphaga
- Infraorder: Cucujiformia
- Family: Cerambycidae
- Genus: Oncideres
- Species: O. alicei

Binomial name
- Oncideres alicei Lane, 1977

Species of beetle

Oncideres alicei is a species of beetle in the family Cerambycidae. It was described by Lane in 1977. It is known from Brazil.
