= Oncideres saga =

Scientific classification
- Kingdom: Animalia
- Phylum: Arthropoda
- Class: Insecta
- Order: Coleoptera
- Suborder: Polyphaga
- Infraorder: Cucujiformia
- Family: Cerambycidae
- Genus: Oncideres
- Species: O. saga

Binomial name
- Oncideres saga (Dalman, 1823)

Species of beetle

Oncideres saga is a species of beetle in the family Cerambycidae. It was described by Dalman in 1823. It is known from Paraguay, Argentina, Uruguay and Brazil. It feeds on Acacia decurrens, Prosopis alba, Prosopis nigra, and Parapiptadenia rigida.
