= Oncideres digna =

Scientific classification
- Kingdom: Animalia
- Phylum: Arthropoda
- Class: Insecta
- Order: Coleoptera
- Suborder: Polyphaga
- Infraorder: Cucujiformia
- Family: Cerambycidae
- Genus: Oncideres
- Species: O. digna

Binomial name
- Oncideres digna Bates, 1865

Synonyms
- Oncideres aegrota Thomson, 1868

Species of beetle

Oncideres digna is a species of beetle in the family Cerambycidae. It was described by Henry Walter Bates in 1865. It is known from Brazil, French Guiana, and Panama.
