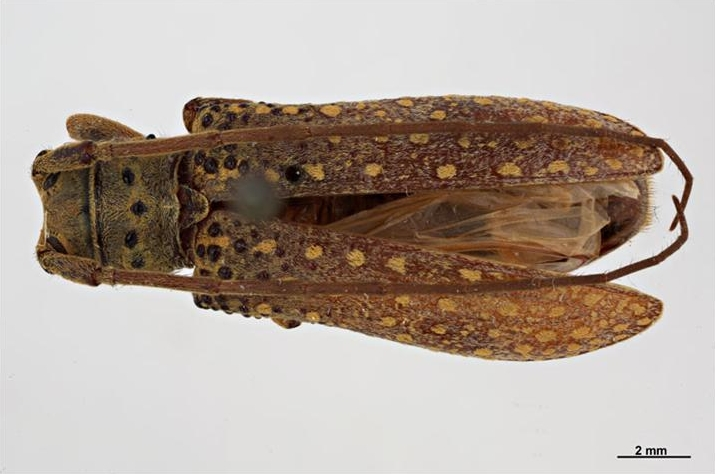

Scientific classification
- Kingdom: Animalia
- Phylum: Arthropoda
- Class: Insecta
- Order: Coleoptera
- Suborder: Polyphaga
- Infraorder: Cucujiformia
- Family: Cerambycidae
- Genus: Oncideres
- Species: O. impluviata

Binomial name
- Oncideres impluviata (Germar, 1842)

Synonyms
- Lamia impluviata Germar, 1824

= Oncideres impluviata =

Species of beetle

Oncideres impluviata is a species of beetle in the family Cerambycidae. It was described by Ernst Friedrich Germar in 1842. It is known from Brazil, Argentina, Uruguay, and Paraguay. It feeds on Parapiptadenia rigida.
