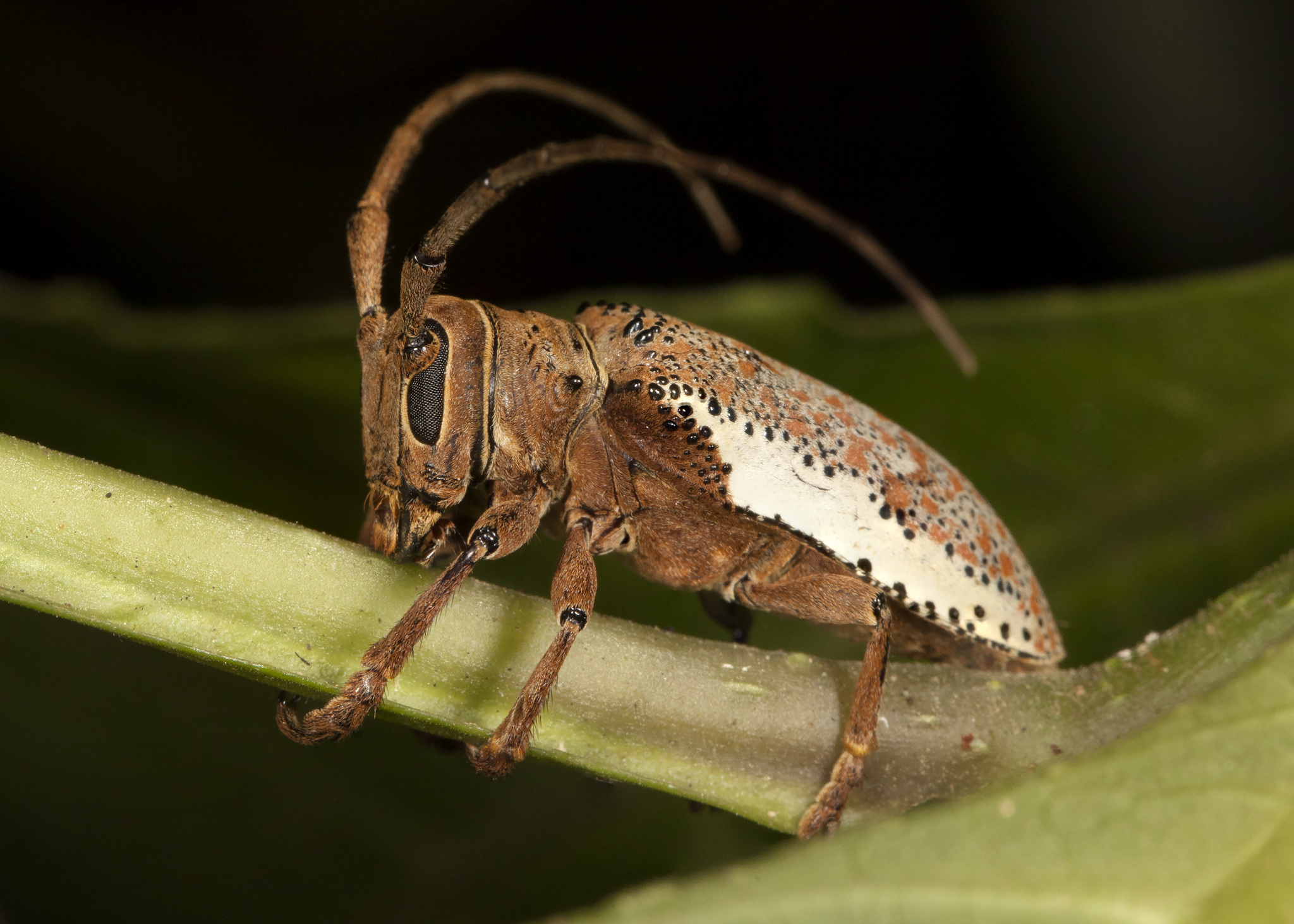

Scientific classification
- Kingdom: Animalia
- Phylum: Arthropoda
- Class: Insecta
- Order: Coleoptera
- Suborder: Polyphaga
- Infraorder: Cucujiformia
- Family: Cerambycidae
- Genus: Oncideres
- Species: O. albomarginata

Binomial name
- Oncideres albomarginata Thomson, 1868

= Oncideres albomarginata =

Species of beetle

Oncideres albomarginata is a species of beetle in the family Cerambycidae. It was described by James Thomson in 1868. It is known from Costa Rica, Ecuador, Colombia, Guatemala, Panama, Guyana, Mexico, Nicaragua, Venezuela, and Trinidad and Tobago.

== Subspecies ==
- Oncideres albomarginata albomarginata Thomson, 1868
- Oncideres albomarginata chamela Chemsak & Giesbert, 1986
