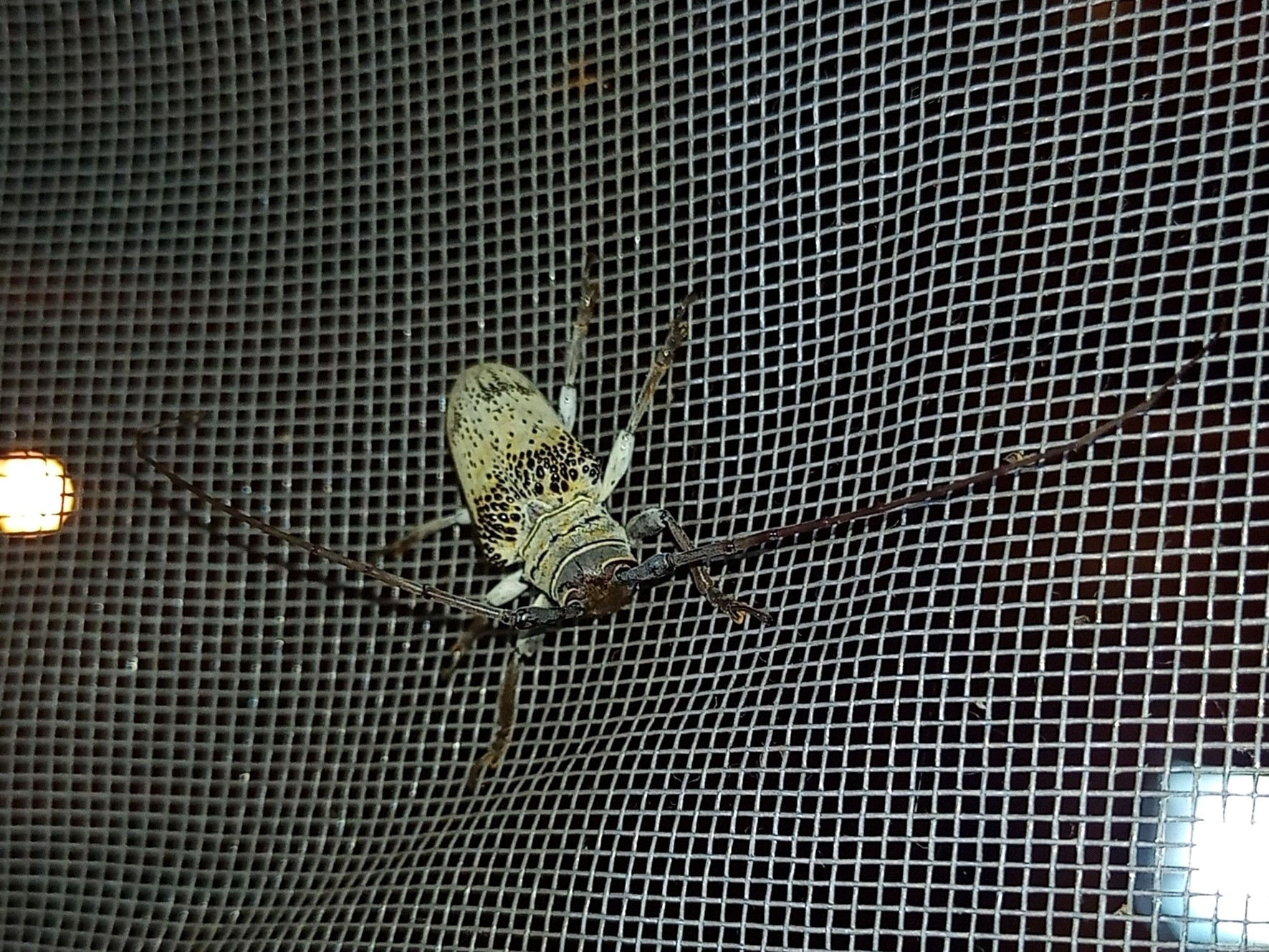

Scientific classification
- Kingdom: Animalia
- Phylum: Arthropoda
- Clade: Pancrustacea
- Class: Insecta
- Order: Coleoptera
- Suborder: Polyphaga
- Infraorder: Cucujiformia
- Family: Cerambycidae
- Genus: Oncideres
- Species: O. = chevrolatii

Binomial name
- Oncideres = chevrolatii Thomson, 1868

Synonyms
- Oncideres defectiofasciata Gilmour, 1950

= Oncideres chevrolatii =

Species of beetle

Oncideres chevrolatii is a species of beetle in the family Cerambycidae. It was first described by James Thomson in 1868. It is known from Brazil.
