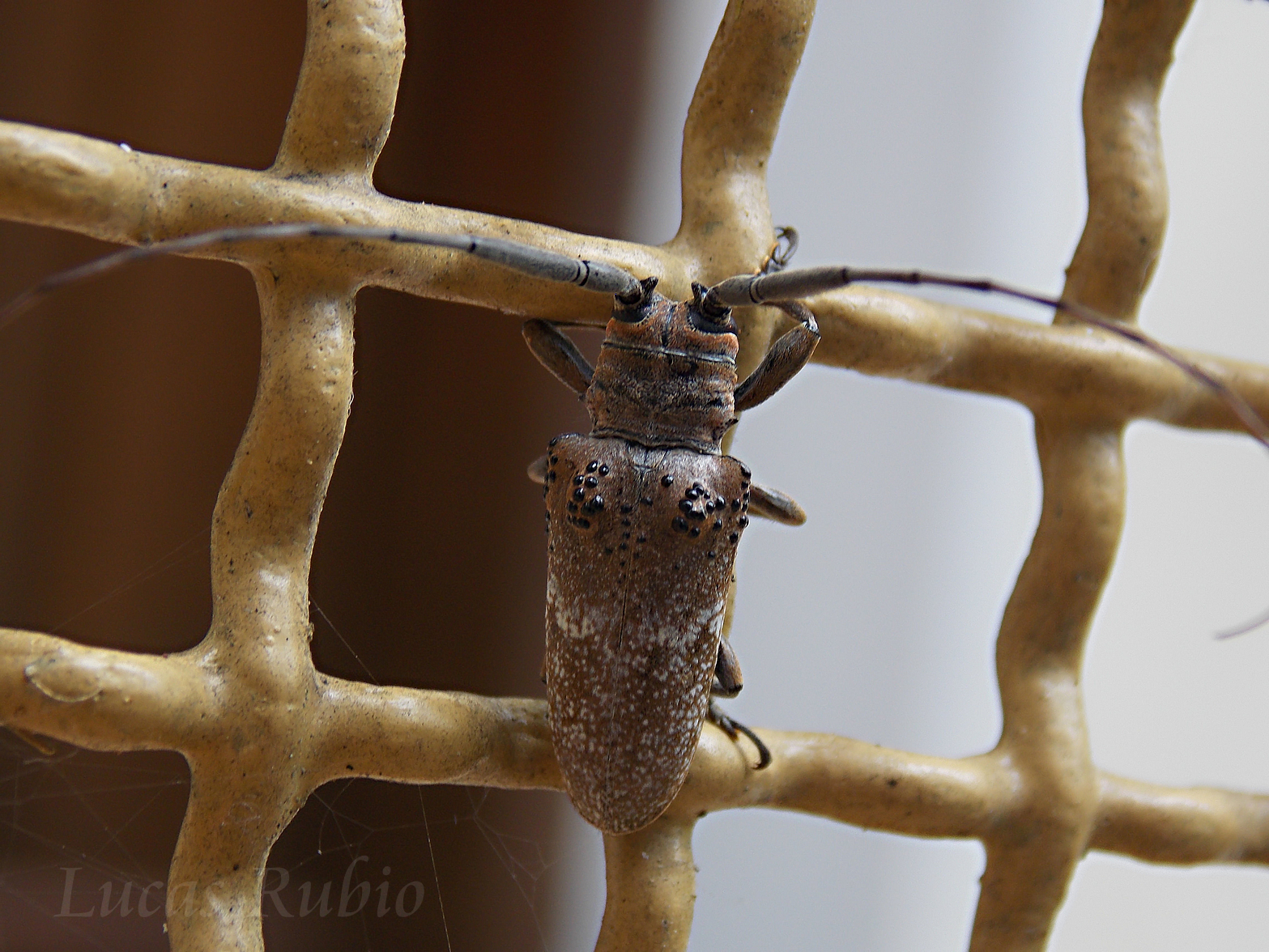

Scientific classification
- Kingdom: Animalia
- Phylum: Arthropoda
- Class: Insecta
- Order: Coleoptera
- Suborder: Polyphaga
- Infraorder: Cucujiformia
- Family: Cerambycidae
- Genus: Oncideres
- Species: O. ulcerosa

Binomial name
- Oncideres ulcerosa (Germar, 1824)

= Oncideres ulcerosa =

Species of beetle

Oncideres ulcerosa is a species of beetle in the family Cerambycidae. It was described by Ernst Friedrich Germar in 1824. It is known from Paraguay and Brazil.
