= Oncideres disiunctus =

Scientific classification
- Kingdom: Animalia
- Phylum: Arthropoda
- Class: Insecta
- Order: Coleoptera
- Suborder: Polyphaga
- Infraorder: Cucujiformia
- Family: Cerambycidae
- Genus: Oncideres
- Species: O. disiunctus

Binomial name
- Oncideres disiunctus Galileo & Martins, 2011

Species of beetle

Oncideres disiunctus is a species of beetle belonging to the family Cerambycidae. It was first described by Galileo and Martins in 2011.
