= Oncideres tuberosa =

Scientific classification
- Kingdom: Animalia
- Phylum: Arthropoda
- Class: Insecta
- Order: Coleoptera
- Suborder: Polyphaga
- Infraorder: Cucujiformia
- Family: Cerambycidae
- Genus: Oncideres
- Species: O. tuberosa

Binomial name
- Oncideres tuberosa Martins & Galileo, 2006

Species of beetle

Oncideres tuberosa is a species of beetle in the family Cerambycidae. It was described by Martins and Galileo in 2006. It is known from Brazil.
