= Oncideres pittieri =

Scientific classification
- Kingdom: Animalia
- Phylum: Arthropoda
- Class: Insecta
- Order: Coleoptera
- Suborder: Polyphaga
- Infraorder: Cucujiformia
- Family: Cerambycidae
- Genus: Oncideres
- Species: O. pittieri

Binomial name
- Oncideres pittieri Gahan, 1894

Species of beetle

Oncideres pittieri is a species of beetle in the family Cerambycidae. It was described by Charles Joseph Gahan in 1894. It is known from Costa Rica.
