= Oncideres fulvostillata =

Scientific classification
- Kingdom: Animalia
- Phylum: Arthropoda
- Class: Insecta
- Order: Coleoptera
- Suborder: Polyphaga
- Infraorder: Cucujiformia
- Family: Cerambycidae
- Genus: Oncideres
- Species: O. fulvostillata

Binomial name
- Oncideres fulvostillata Bates, 1872

Species of beetle

Oncideres fulvostillata is a species of beetle in the family Cerambycidae. It was described by Henry Walter Bates in 1872. It is known from Mexico, Panama, Nicaragua, and Costa Rica.
