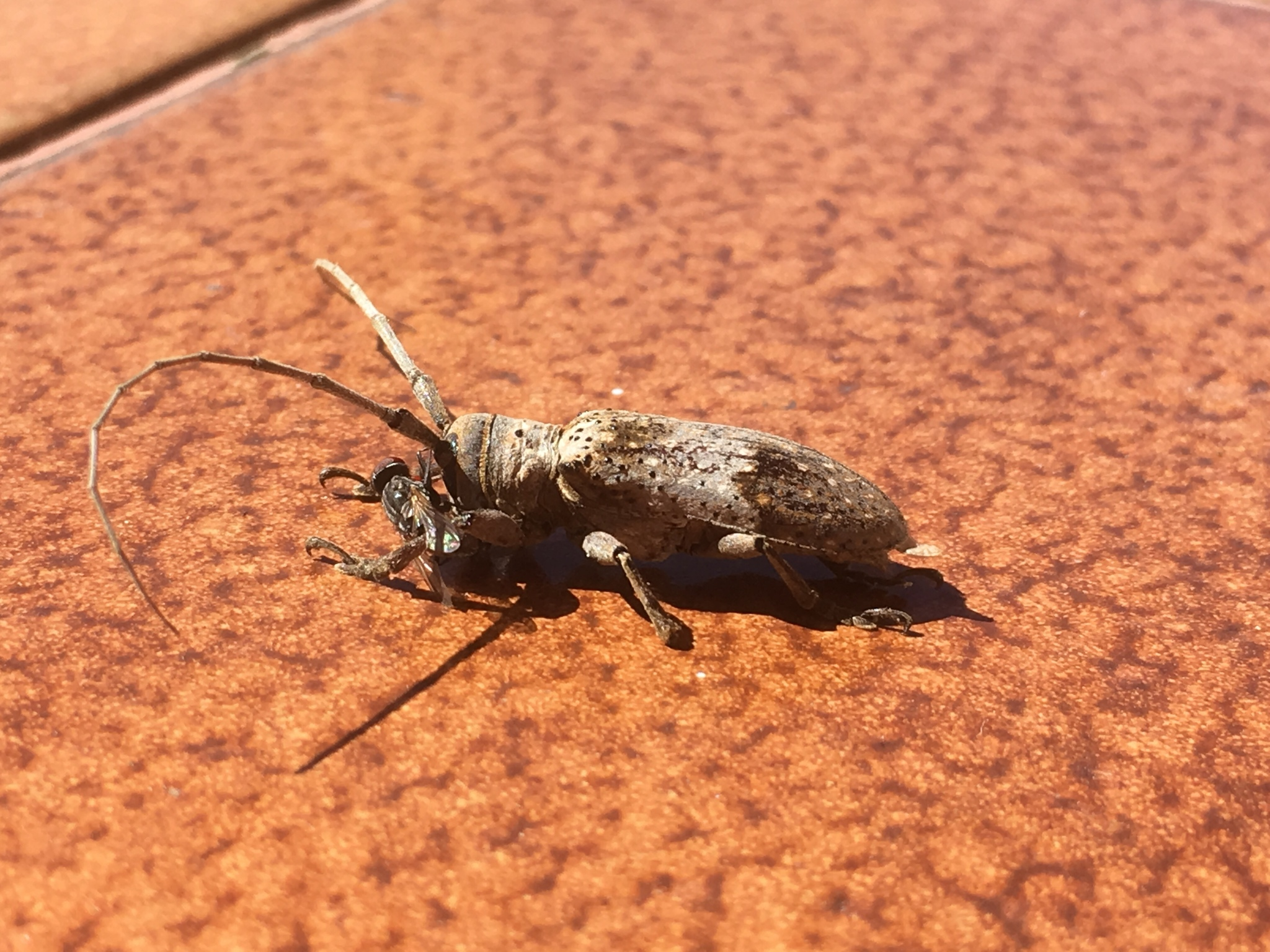

Scientific classification
- Kingdom: Animalia
- Phylum: Arthropoda
- Class: Insecta
- Order: Coleoptera
- Suborder: Polyphaga
- Infraorder: Cucujiformia
- Family: Cerambycidae
- Genus: Oncideres
- Species: O. putator

Binomial name
- Oncideres putator Thomson, 1868

= Oncideres putator =

Species of beetle

Oncideres putator is a species of beetle in the family Cerambycidae. It was described by James Thomson in 1868.

== Subspecies ==
- Oncideres putator brevifasciatus Dillon & Dillon, 1946
- Oncideres putator putator Thomson, 1868
