= Oncideres estebani =

Scientific classification
- Kingdom: Animalia
- Phylum: Arthropoda
- Class: Insecta
- Order: Coleoptera
- Suborder: Polyphaga
- Infraorder: Cucujiformia
- Family: Cerambycidae
- Genus: Oncideres
- Species: O. estebani

Binomial name
- Oncideres estebani Martins & Galileo, 2010

Species of beetle

Oncideres estebani is a species of beetle in the family Cerambycidae. It was described by Martins and Galileo in 2010. It is known from Costa Rica.
