= Oncideres malleri =

Scientific classification
- Kingdom: Animalia
- Phylum: Arthropoda
- Class: Insecta
- Order: Coleoptera
- Suborder: Polyphaga
- Infraorder: Cucujiformia
- Family: Cerambycidae
- Genus: Oncideres
- Species: O. malleri

Binomial name
- Oncideres malleri Fragoso, 1970

Species of beetle

Oncideres malleri is a species of beetle in the family Cerambycidae. It was described by S. A. Fragoso in 1970. It is known from Brazil.
