= Oncideres guttulata =

Scientific classification
- Kingdom: Animalia
- Phylum: Arthropoda
- Class: Insecta
- Order: Coleoptera
- Suborder: Polyphaga
- Infraorder: Cucujiformia
- Family: Cerambycidae
- Genus: Oncideres
- Species: O. guttulata

Binomial name
- Oncideres guttulata Thomson, 1868

Species of beetle

Oncideres guttulata is a species of beetle in the family Cerambycidae. It was described by James Thomson in 1868. It is known from Argentina, Brazil and Uruguay. It feeds on Acacia caven and Vachellia farnesiana.
