= Oncideres jatai =

Scientific classification
- Kingdom: Animalia
- Phylum: Arthropoda
- Class: Insecta
- Order: Coleoptera
- Suborder: Polyphaga
- Infraorder: Cucujiformia
- Family: Cerambycidae
- Genus: Oncideres
- Species: O. jatai

Binomial name
- Oncideres jatai Bondar, 1953

Species of beetle

Oncideres jatai is a species of beetle in the family Cerambycidae. It was described by Bondar in 1953. It is known from Brazil.
