= Oncideres miliaris =

Scientific classification
- Kingdom: Animalia
- Phylum: Arthropoda
- Class: Insecta
- Order: Coleoptera
- Suborder: Polyphaga
- Infraorder: Cucujiformia
- Family: Cerambycidae
- Genus: Oncideres
- Species: O. miliaris

Binomial name
- Oncideres miliaris (Schönherr, 1817)

Synonyms
- Cerambyx miliaris Voet, 1781 (Unav.); Lamia Miliaris Schönherr, 1817

Species of beetle

Oncideres miliaris is a species of beetle in the family Cerambycidae. It was described by Schönherr in 1817. It is known from French Guiana.
