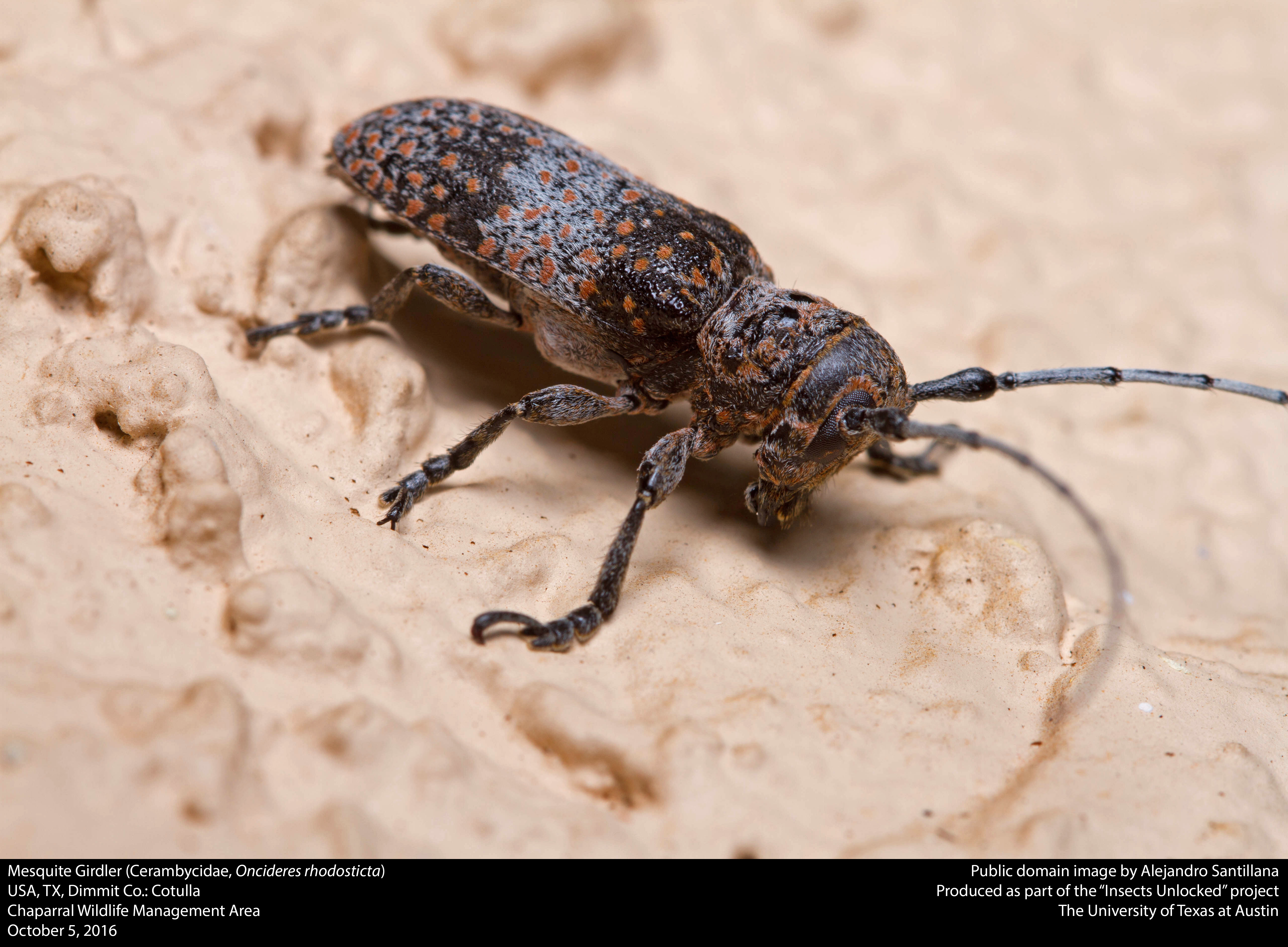

Scientific classification
- Kingdom: Animalia
- Phylum: Arthropoda
- Class: Insecta
- Order: Coleoptera
- Suborder: Polyphaga
- Infraorder: Cucujiformia
- Family: Cerambycidae
- Genus: Oncideres
- Species: O. rhodosticta

Binomial name
- Oncideres rhodosticta Bates, 1885

= Oncideres rhodosticta =

Species of beetle

Oncideres rhodosticta is a species of beetle in the family Cerambycidae. It was described by Henry Walter Bates in 1885. It is known from the United States and Mexico.
