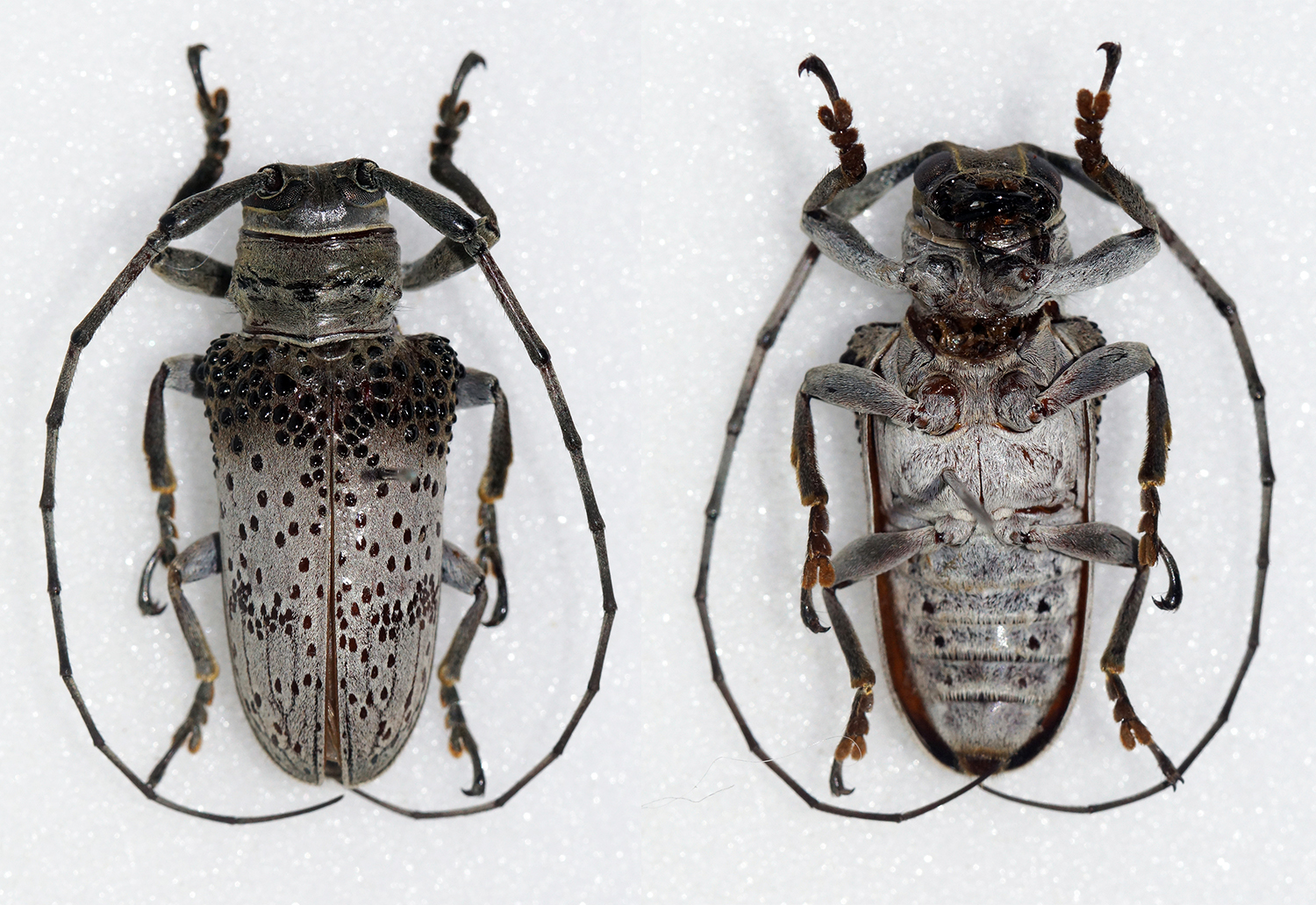

Scientific classification
- Kingdom: Animalia
- Phylum: Arthropoda
- Class: Insecta
- Order: Coleoptera
- Suborder: Polyphaga
- Infraorder: Cucujiformia
- Family: Cerambycidae
- Genus: Oncideres
- Species: O. cephalotes

Binomial name
- Oncideres cephalotes Bates, 1865

= Oncideres cephalotes =

Species of beetle

Oncideres cephalotes is a species of beetle in the family Cerambycidae. It was described by Henry Walter Bates in 1865. It is known from Brazil and French Guiana.
