= Oncideres sobrina =

Scientific classification
- Kingdom: Animalia
- Phylum: Arthropoda
- Class: Insecta
- Order: Coleoptera
- Suborder: Polyphaga
- Infraorder: Cucujiformia
- Family: Cerambycidae
- Genus: Oncideres
- Species: O. sobrina

Binomial name
- Oncideres sobrina Dillon & Dillon, 1946

Species of beetle

Oncideres sobrina is a species of beetle in the family Cerambycidae. It was described by Dillon and Dillon in 1946. It is known from Colombia and Panama.
