= Oncideres dalmani =

Scientific classification
- Kingdom: Animalia
- Phylum: Arthropoda
- Class: Insecta
- Order: Coleoptera
- Suborder: Polyphaga
- Infraorder: Cucujiformia
- Family: Cerambycidae
- Genus: Oncideres
- Species: O. dalmani

Binomial name
- Oncideres dalmani Thomson, 1868

Synonyms
- Oncideres dalmanii Thomson, 1868

Species of beetle

Oncideres dalmani is a species of beetle in the family Cerambycidae. It was described by James Thomson in 1868. It is known from Brazil and French Guiana.
