= Oncideres chagasi =

Scientific classification
- Kingdom: Animalia
- Phylum: Arthropoda
- Class: Insecta
- Order: Coleoptera
- Suborder: Polyphaga
- Infraorder: Cucujiformia
- Family: Cerambycidae
- Genus: Oncideres
- Species: O. chagasi

Binomial name
- Oncideres chagasi Martins, 1981

Species of beetle

Oncideres chagasi is a species of beetle in the family Cerambycidae. It was described by Martins in 1981. It is known from Brazil.
