= Oncideres bouchardi =

Scientific classification
- Kingdom: Animalia
- Phylum: Arthropoda
- Class: Insecta
- Order: Coleoptera
- Suborder: Polyphaga
- Infraorder: Cucujiformia
- Family: Cerambycidae
- Genus: Oncideres
- Species: O. bouchardi

Binomial name
- Oncideres bouchardi Bates, 1865

Synonyms
- Oncideres bouchardii Bates, 1865

Species of beetle

Oncideres bouchardi is a species of beetle in the family Cerambycidae. It was described by Henry Walter Bates in 1865. It is known from Colombia, Panama and Venezuela.
