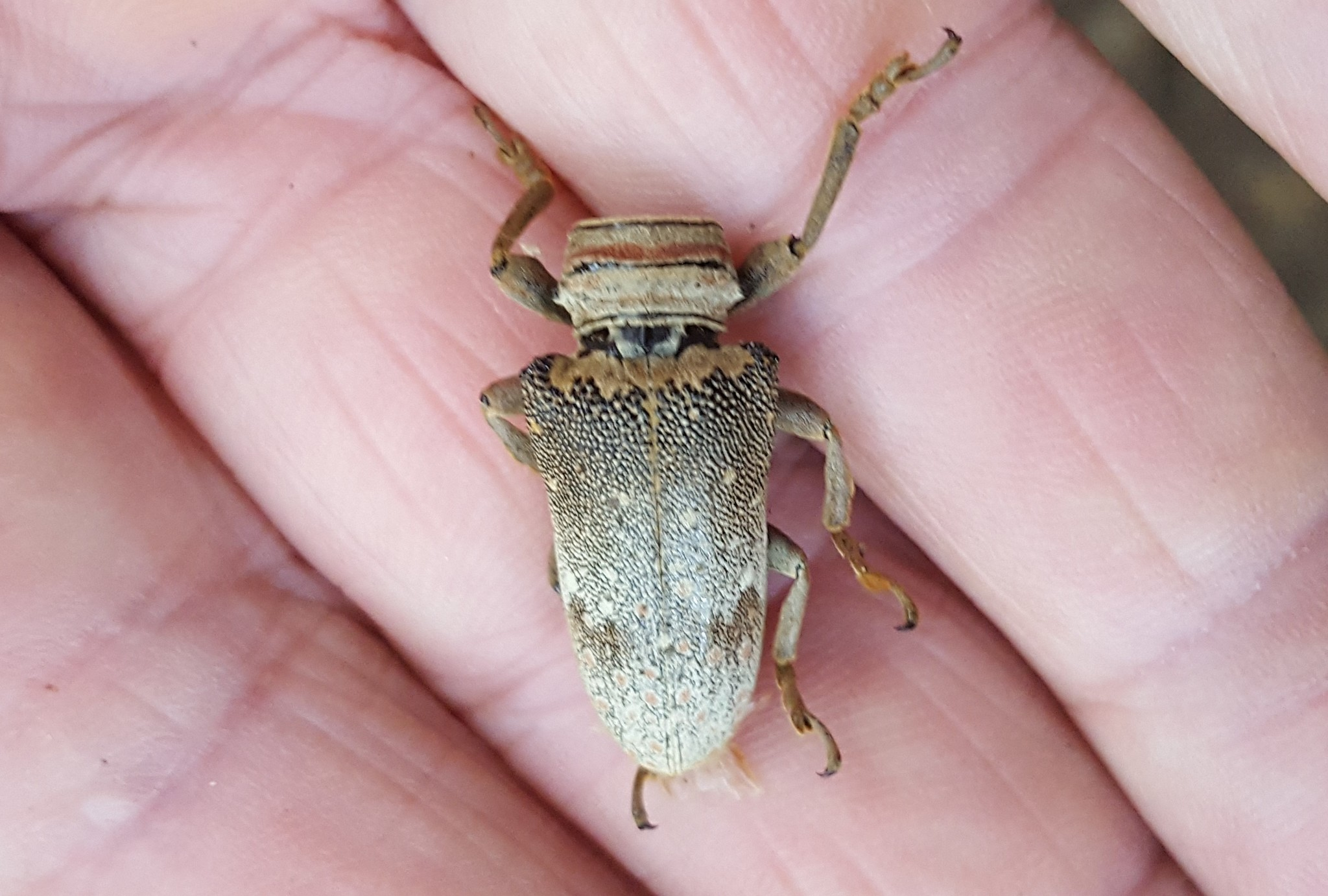

Scientific classification
- Kingdom: Animalia
- Phylum: Arthropoda
- Class: Insecta
- Order: Coleoptera
- Suborder: Polyphaga
- Infraorder: Cucujiformia
- Family: Cerambycidae
- Genus: Oncideres
- Species: O. dejeanii

Binomial name
- Oncideres dejeanii Thomson, 1868

= Oncideres dejeanii =

Species of beetle

Oncideres dejeanii is a species of beetle in the family Cerambycidae. It was described by James Thomson in 1868. It is known from Argentina, Paraguay, Brazil and Uruguay.
