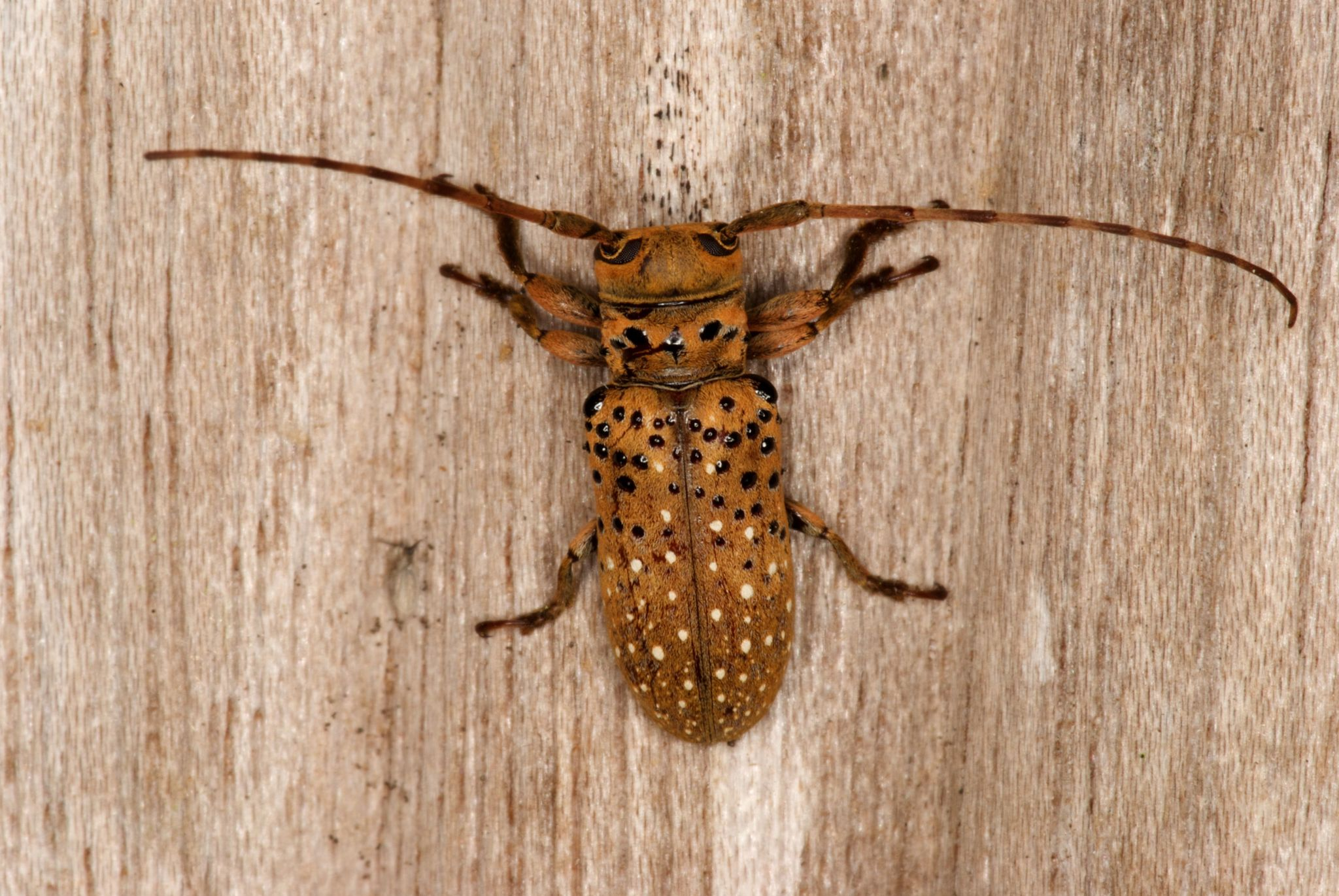

Scientific classification
- Kingdom: Animalia
- Phylum: Arthropoda
- Class: Insecta
- Order: Coleoptera
- Suborder: Polyphaga
- Infraorder: Cucujiformia
- Family: Cerambycidae
- Genus: Oncideres
- Species: O. minuta

Binomial name
- Oncideres minuta Thomson, 1868

= Oncideres minuta =

Species of beetle

Oncideres minuta is a species of beetle in the family Cerambycidae. It was described by James Thomson in 1868. It is known from Ecuador and French Guiana.
