= Algarrobo blanco =

Algarrobo blanco is a common name of Spanish origin for several plants and may refer to:

- Prosopis alba
- sometimes Prosopis pallida, native to Colombia, Ecuador, and Peru
