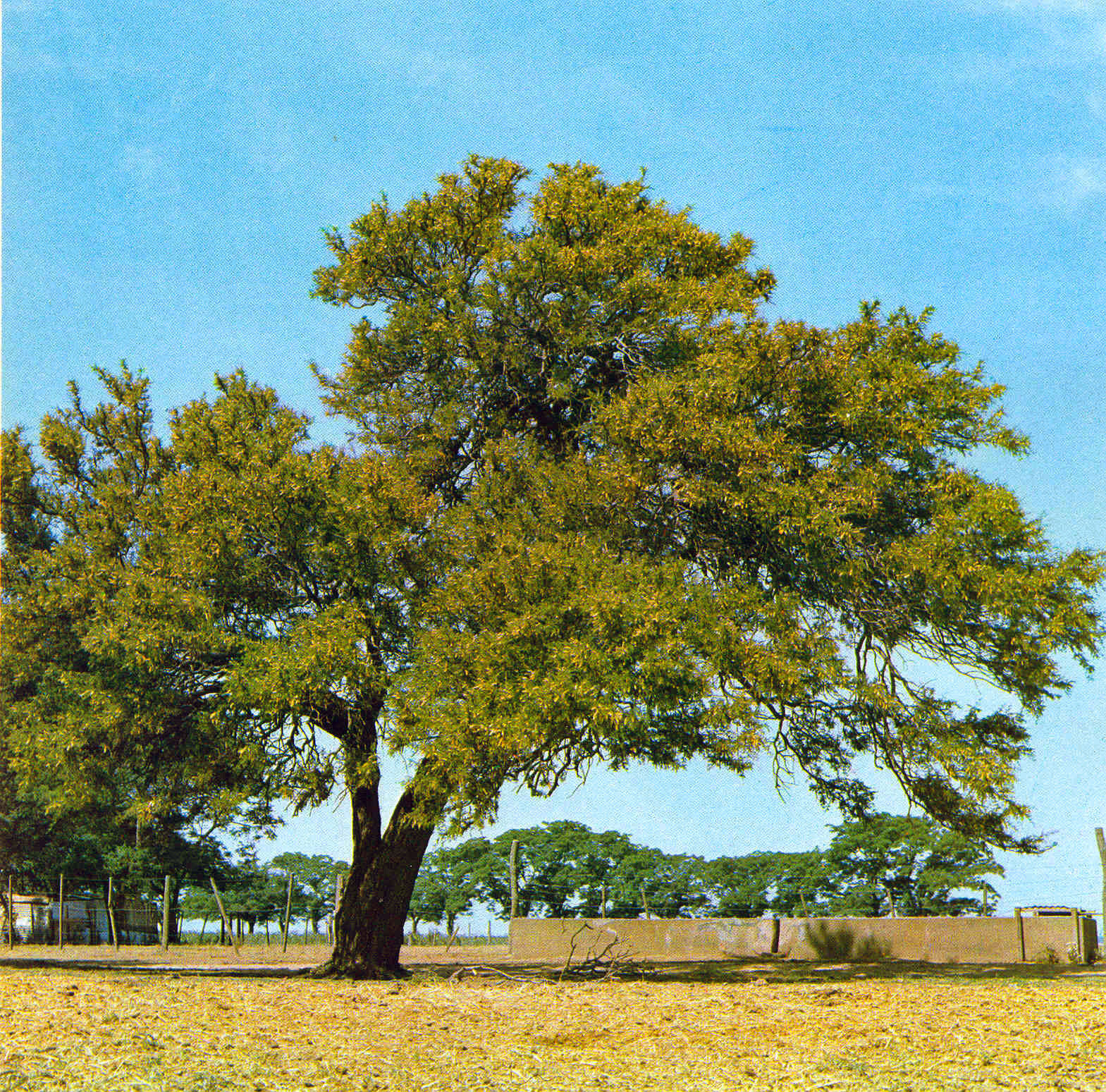

Conservation status
- Data Deficient (IUCN 2.3)

Scientific classification
- Kingdom: Plantae
- Clade: Tracheophytes
- Clade: Angiosperms
- Clade: Eudicots
- Clade: Rosids
- Order: Fabales
- Family: Fabaceae
- Subfamily: Caesalpinioideae
- Clade: Mimosoid clade
- Genus: Neltuma
- Species: N. affinis

Binomial name
- Neltuma affinis (Spreng.) C.E.Hughes & G.P.Lewis

Synonyms
- Prosopis affinis

= Neltuma affinis =

Species of legume

Neltuma affinis (formerly Prosopis affinis) is a species of flowering tree in the family Fabaceae, that is native to Argentina, Brazil, Paraguay, and Uruguay. Common names include algarrobillo, ibopé-morotí, and ñandubay. It is threatened by habitat loss.

It is a honey plant.
