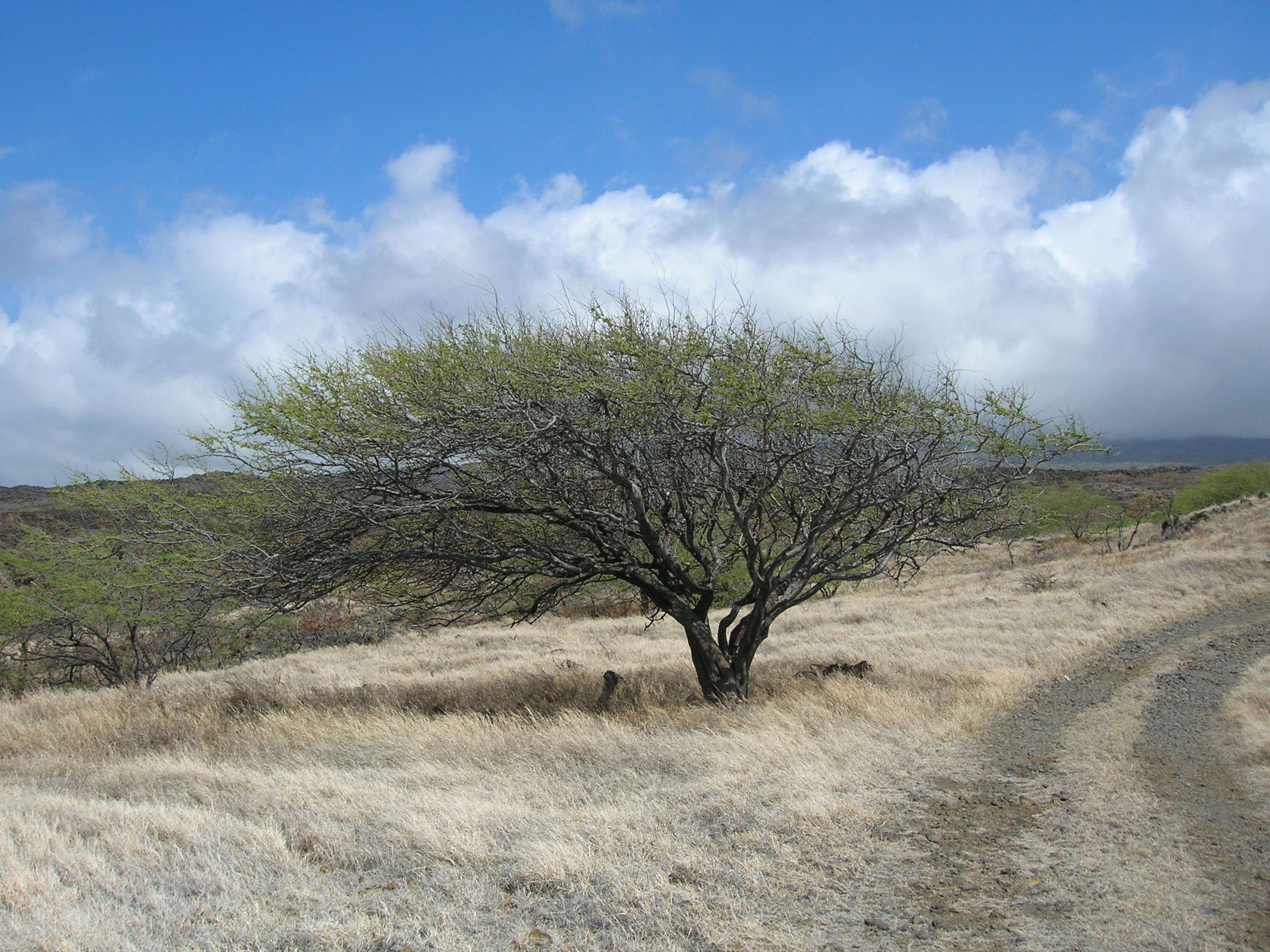

Scientific classification
- Kingdom: Plantae
- Clade: Tracheophytes
- Clade: Angiosperms
- Clade: Eudicots
- Clade: Rosids
- Order: Fabales
- Family: Fabaceae
- Subfamily: Caesalpinioideae
- Clade: Mimosoid clade
- Genus: Neltuma
- Species: N. pallida

Binomial name
- Neltuma pallida (Humb. & Bonpl. ex Willd.) C.E.Hughes & G.P.Lewis

Synonyms
- Acacia pallida Humb. & Bonpl. ex Willd.; Mitostax pallida (Humb. & Bonpl. ex Willd.) Raf.; Prosopis pallida (Humb. & Bonpl. ex Willd.) Kunth

= Neltuma pallida =

Species of legume

Neltuma pallida (formerly Prosopis pallida) is a species of mesquite tree. It has the common names kiawe (/kiːˈɑːveɪ/) (in Hawaii), huarango (in its native South America) and American carob, as well as "bayahonda" (a generic term for Prosopis), "algarrobo pálido" (in some parts of Ecuador and Peru), and "algarrobo blanco" (usually used for Prosopis alba). It is a thorny legume, native to Colombia, Ecuador and Peru, particularly drier areas near the coast. While threatened in its native habitat, it is considered an invasive species in many other places.

== Description ==
The kiawe is a spreading bush or moderately sized tree, bearing spines, spikes of greenish-yellow flowers, and long pods filled with small brown seeds. It is a successful invasive species due to its ability to reproduce in two ways: production of large numbers of easily dispersed seeds, and suckering to create thick monotypic stands that shade out nearby competing plants. It survives well in dry environments due to a long taproot which can reach deep watertables. It is so efficient at extracting moisture from soil that it can kill nearby plants by depriving them of water, as well as by shading them out. It can be found in areas where other plants do not grow, such as sandy, dry, degraded slopes, salty soils, disturbed areas, and rocky cliffs.

== Human uses ==
The tree grows quickly and can live for over a millennium. It makes a good shade tree, if one does not mind the nasty thorns of the fallen branches. Its hard wood is a source of long-burning firewood and charcoal. Kiawe pods can be used as livestock fodder, ground into flour, turned into molasses or used to make beer. The light yellow flowers attract bees, which produce from them a sought-after white honey.

== Hazards to humans ==
Fallen Kiawe branches usually contain sharp spines that can puncture both feet and tires.

== Status as an invasive species in Hawaii ==
At times the tree was used to replace forest and prevent erosion, and once it was established it generally dominates the habitat. It was introduced to Puerto Rico and Hawaii as well as New South Wales and Queensland in Australia and is now naturalized in those places. The first kiawe was planted in Hawaii in 1828; today it is a ubiquitous shade tree and invasive weed on the Hawaiian Islands, but provides firewood for heating and cooking.

== Collapse of the Nazca culture ==
The clearing of kiawe (huarango) has been suggested as a major reason for the collapse of the Nazca culture in southern Peru at the beginning of the 6th century AD after an El Niño event led to flooding, erosion and desertification.

== Importance in the desert ecosystem ==
Ecologists consider the huarango important to the ecosystem of the desert area west of the Andes in southern Peru, because of its ability to bind moisture and counter erosion. Despite prohibitions by regional authorities, poor villagers continue to harvest the trees to make charcoal. Efforts are under way to reforest the area with huarangos.

== Genetic variability ==
In the southwest of Ecuador, Prosopis pallida and Prosopis juliflora both display substantial genetic variability due to the (intraspecific) cross-pollination of their self-incompatible flowers which are typical of the genus Prosopis. As a result, trees of these species display a range of physical traits that lead to trees of one species resembling descriptions of the other, and the two species are often confused. To compound the difficulty in discerning the species of a given tree, these two species hybridise readily where their ranges overlap. In the semi-arid Zapotillo Canton of Ecuador, both thorn-bearing and thornless strains of Prosopis pallida exist with thorn-bearing trees being more common. It is the preferred tree of the local people for making charcoal and is sometimes also cut for firewood or fence posts.

== History ==
The first specimen in Hawaii was planted from a seed brought by missionary Alexis Bachelot from the Palais-Royal Gardens in 1828.

== Photos ==
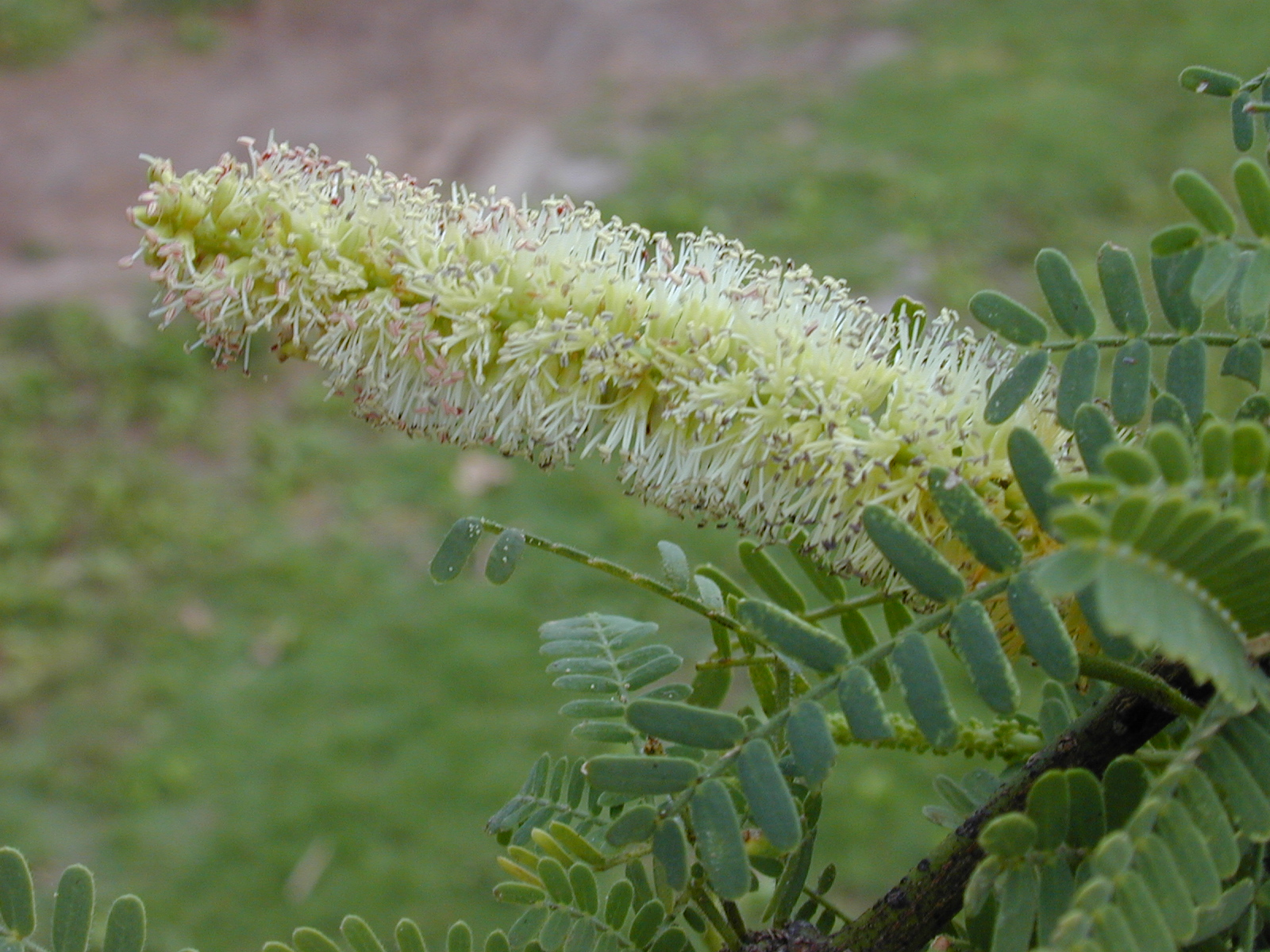
Flower

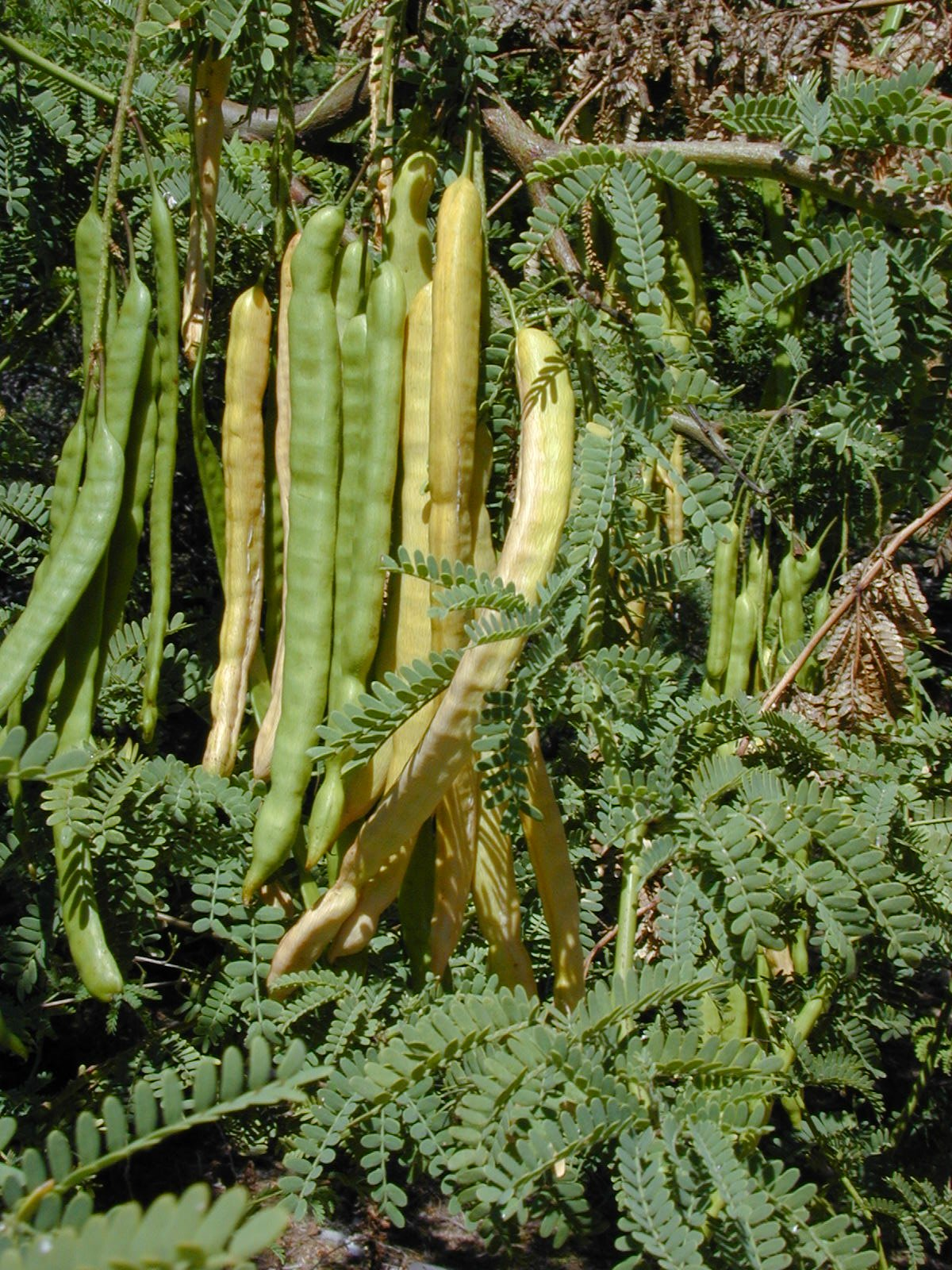
Pods

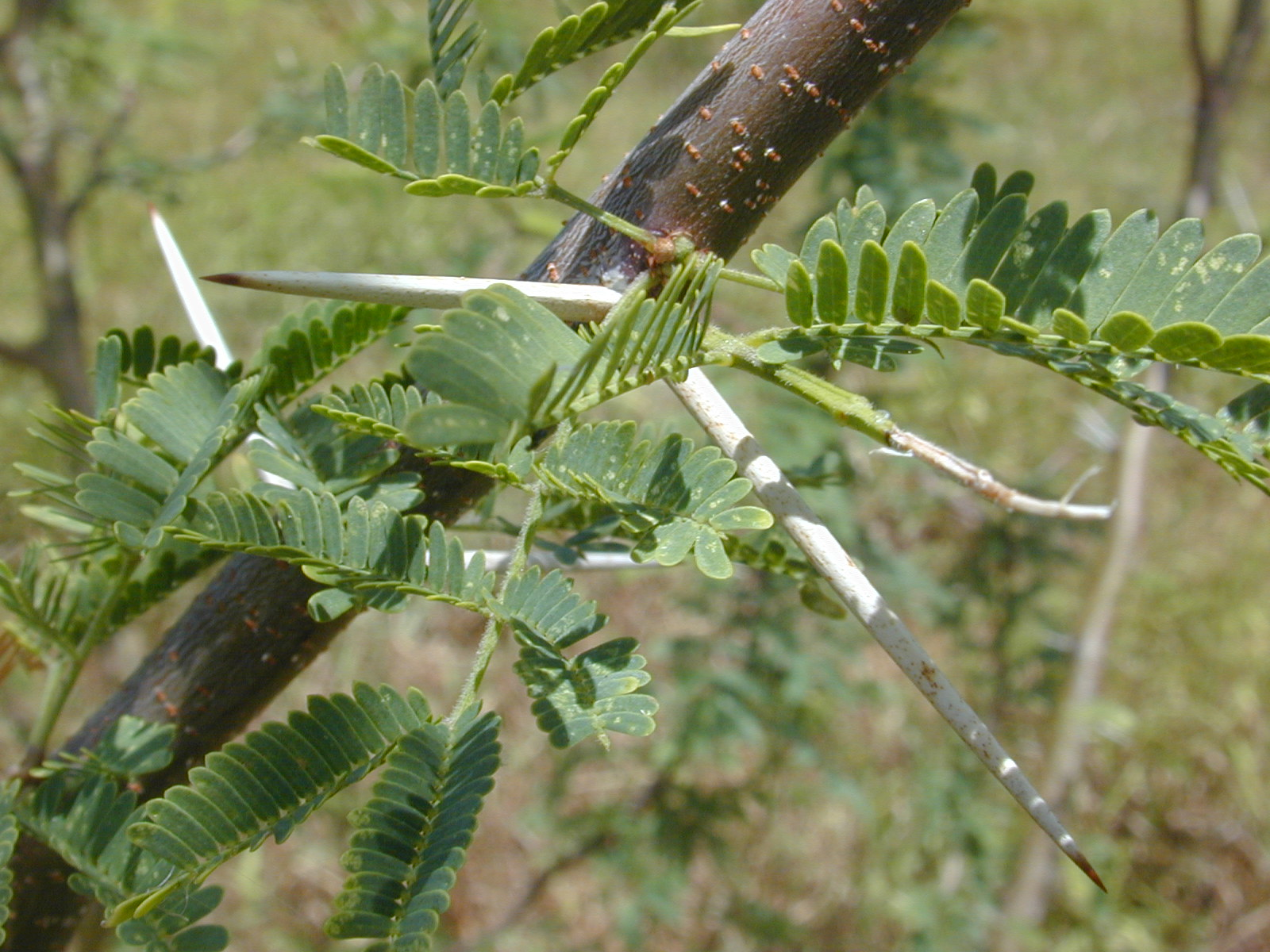
Spines and leaves

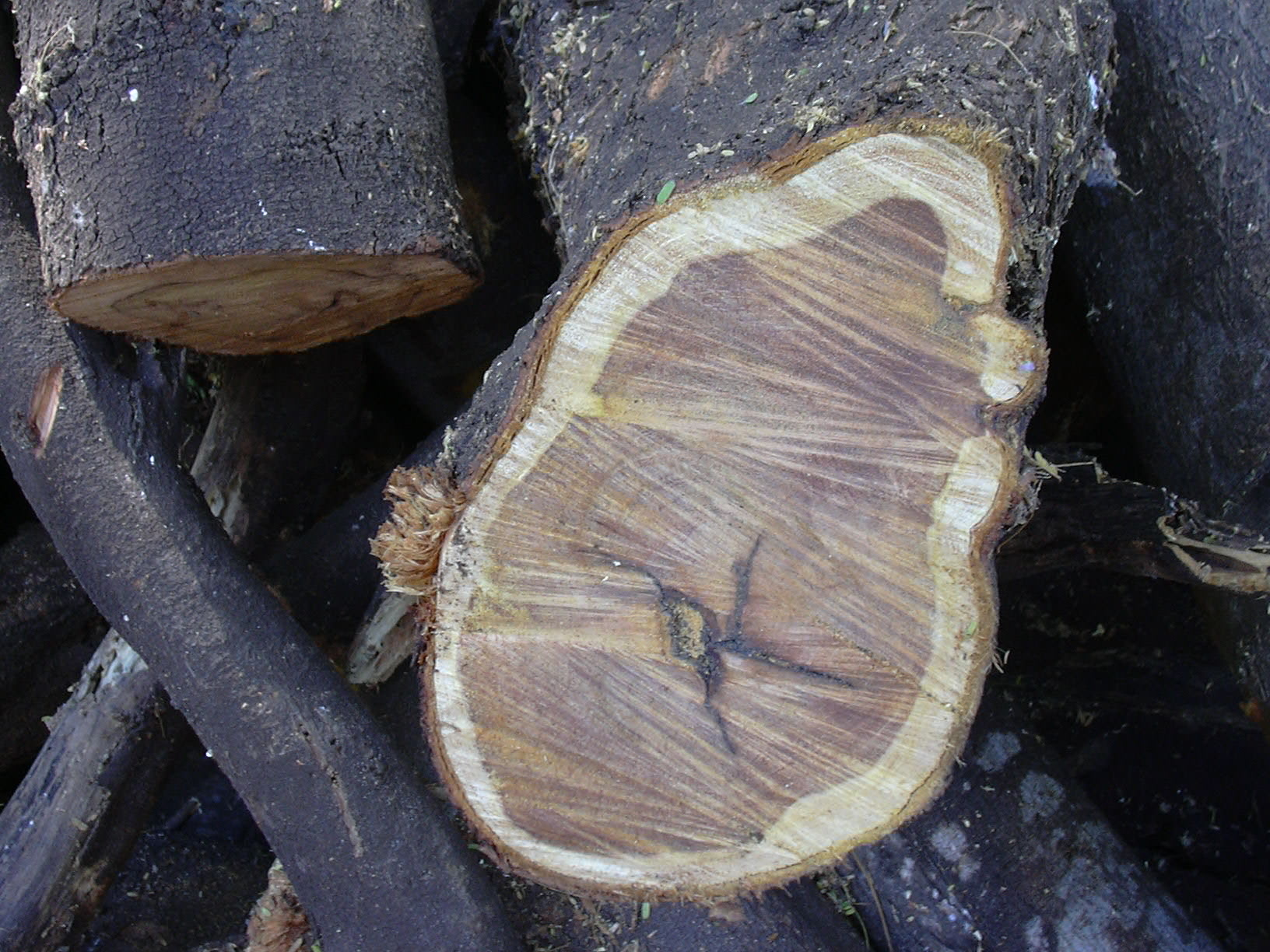
Wood

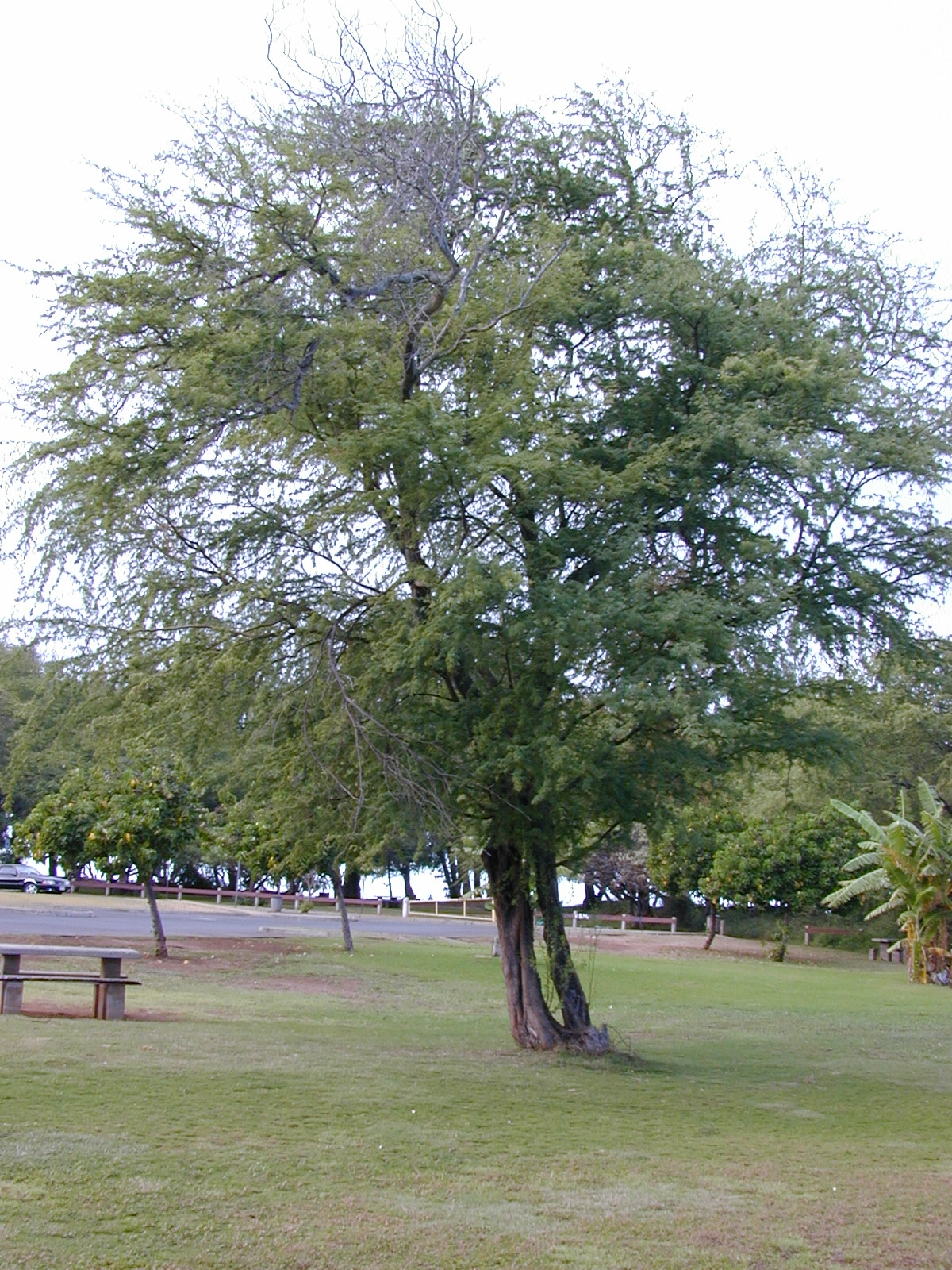

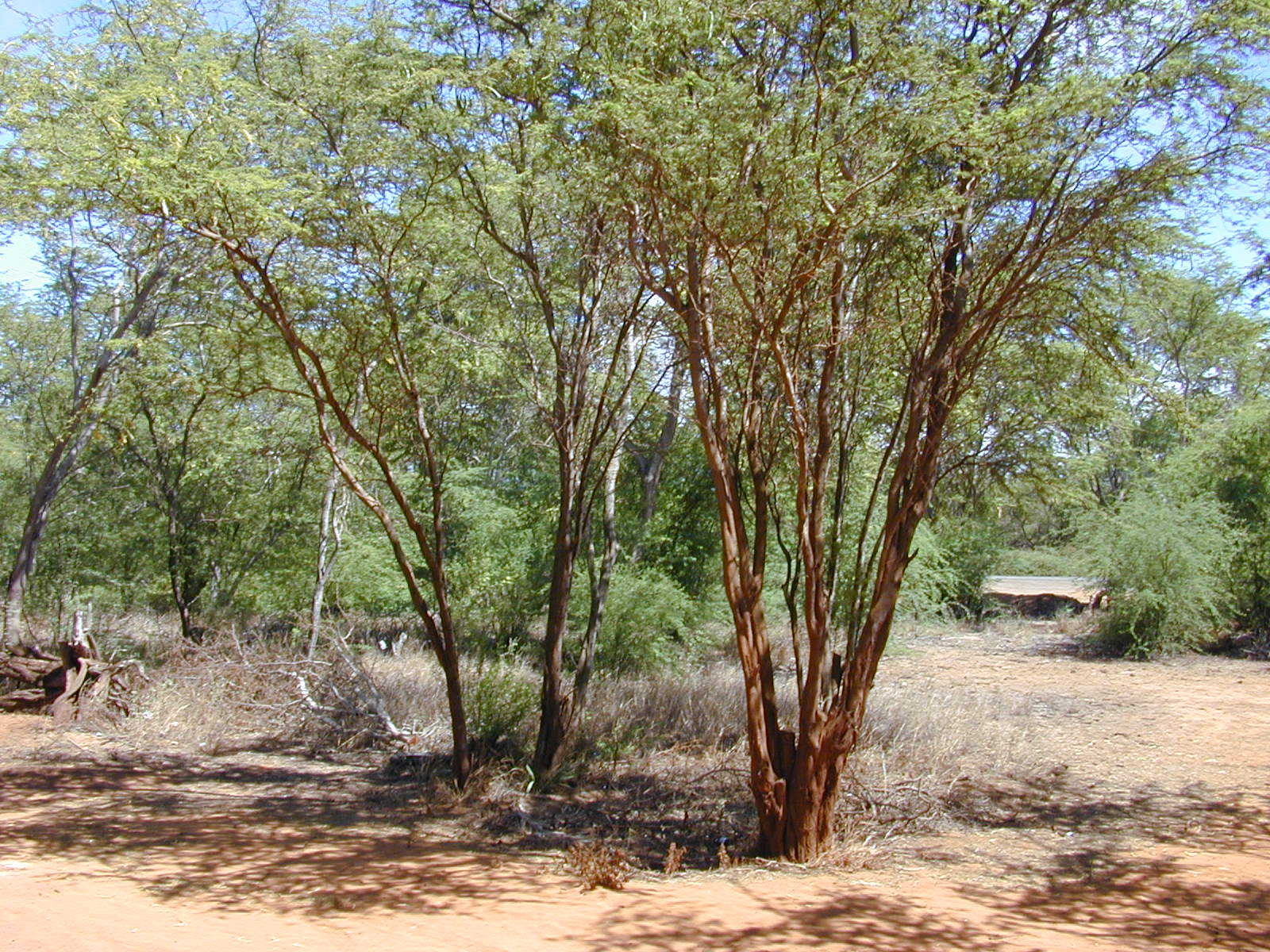

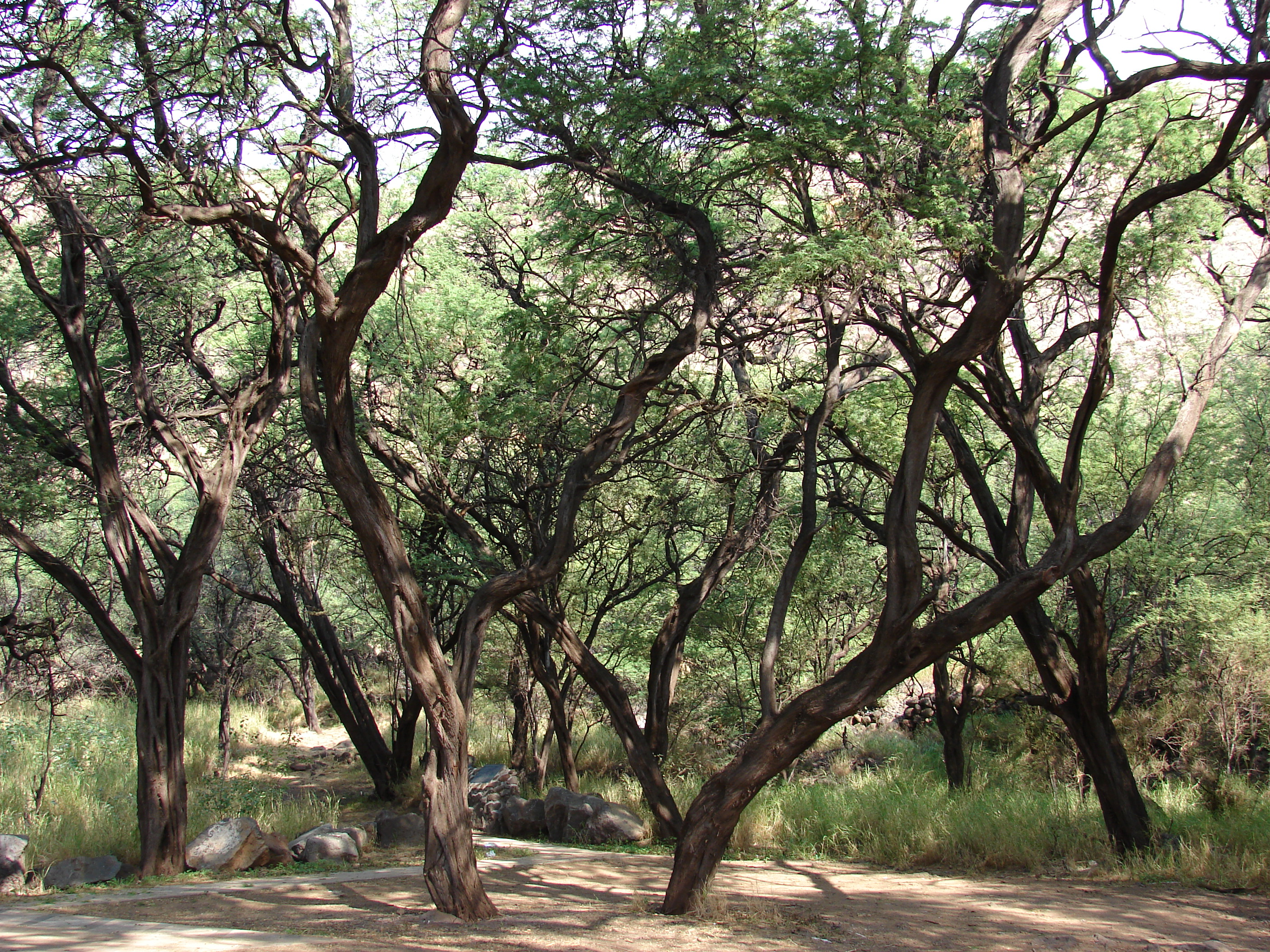

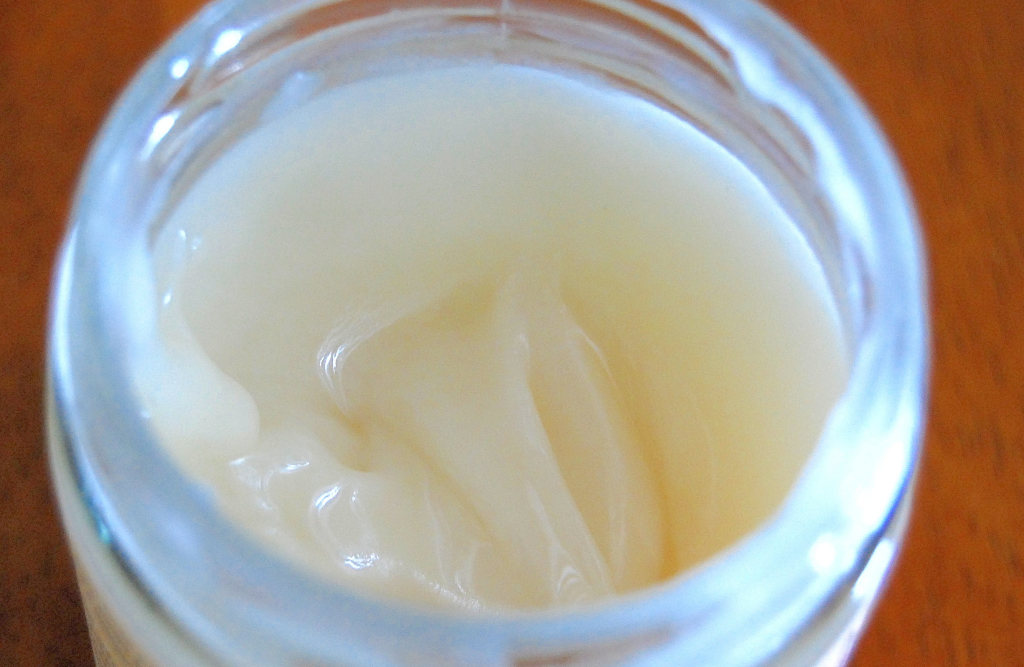
White honey
