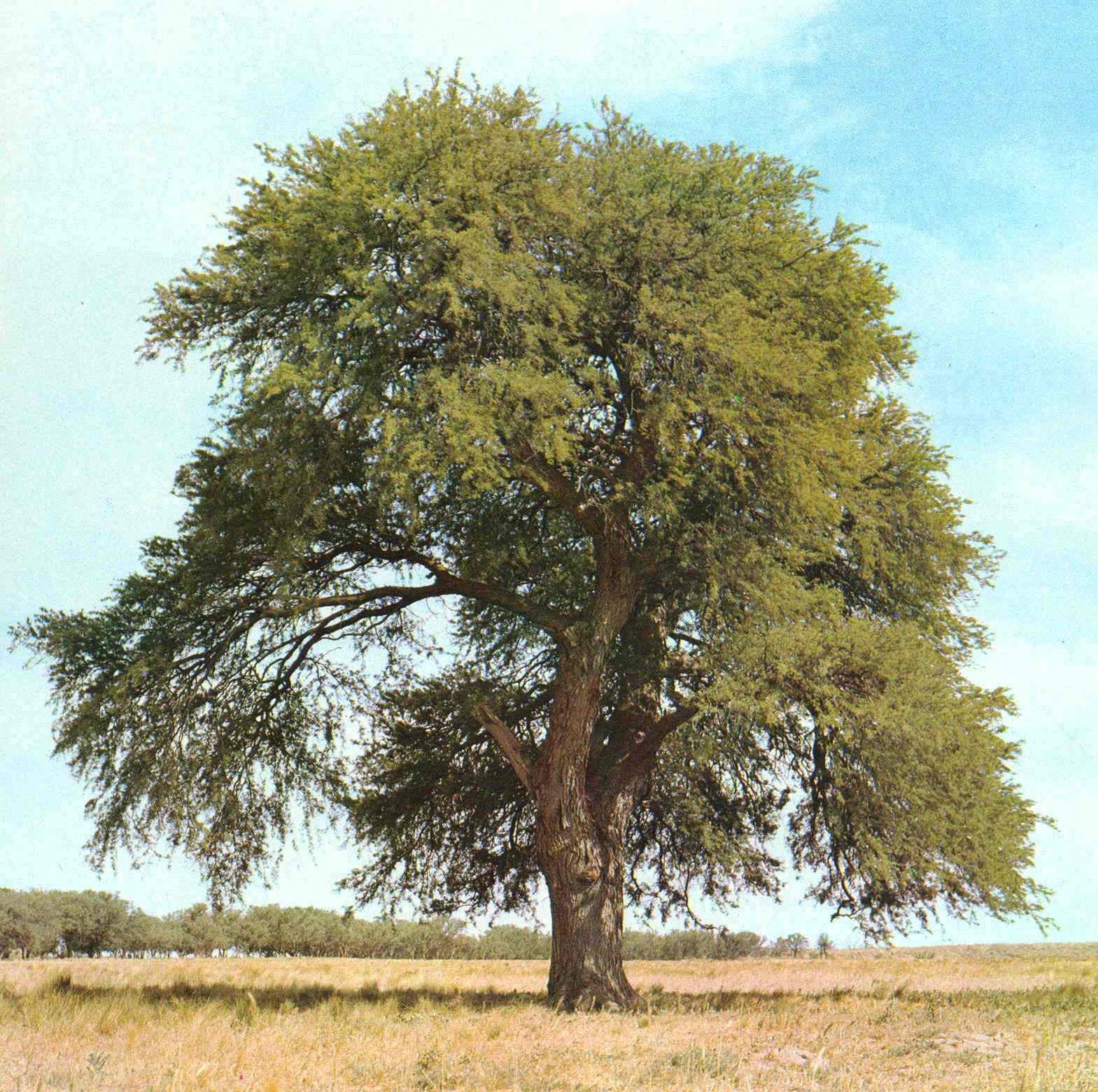
- Neltuma caldenia

Scientific classification
- Kingdom: Plantae
- Clade: Tracheophytes
- Clade: Angiosperms
- Clade: Eudicots
- Clade: Rosids
- Order: Fabales
- Family: Fabaceae
- Subfamily: Caesalpinioideae
- Clade: Mimosoid clade
- Genus: Neltuma; Raf. (1838)

Species
- 43; see text

Synonyms
- Algarobia (DC.) Benth. (1839); Mitostax Raf. (1838)

= Neltuma =

Genus of flowering plants

Neltuma is a genus of flowering plants in the pea family (Fabaceae). It includes 43 species native to the Americas, which were previously placed in genus Prosopis. The species range from the southwestern and central United States through Mexico, Central America, the Caribbean, and South America to southern Argentina and Uruguay. Along with related species in the genus Strombocarpa, some species are known as mesquites.

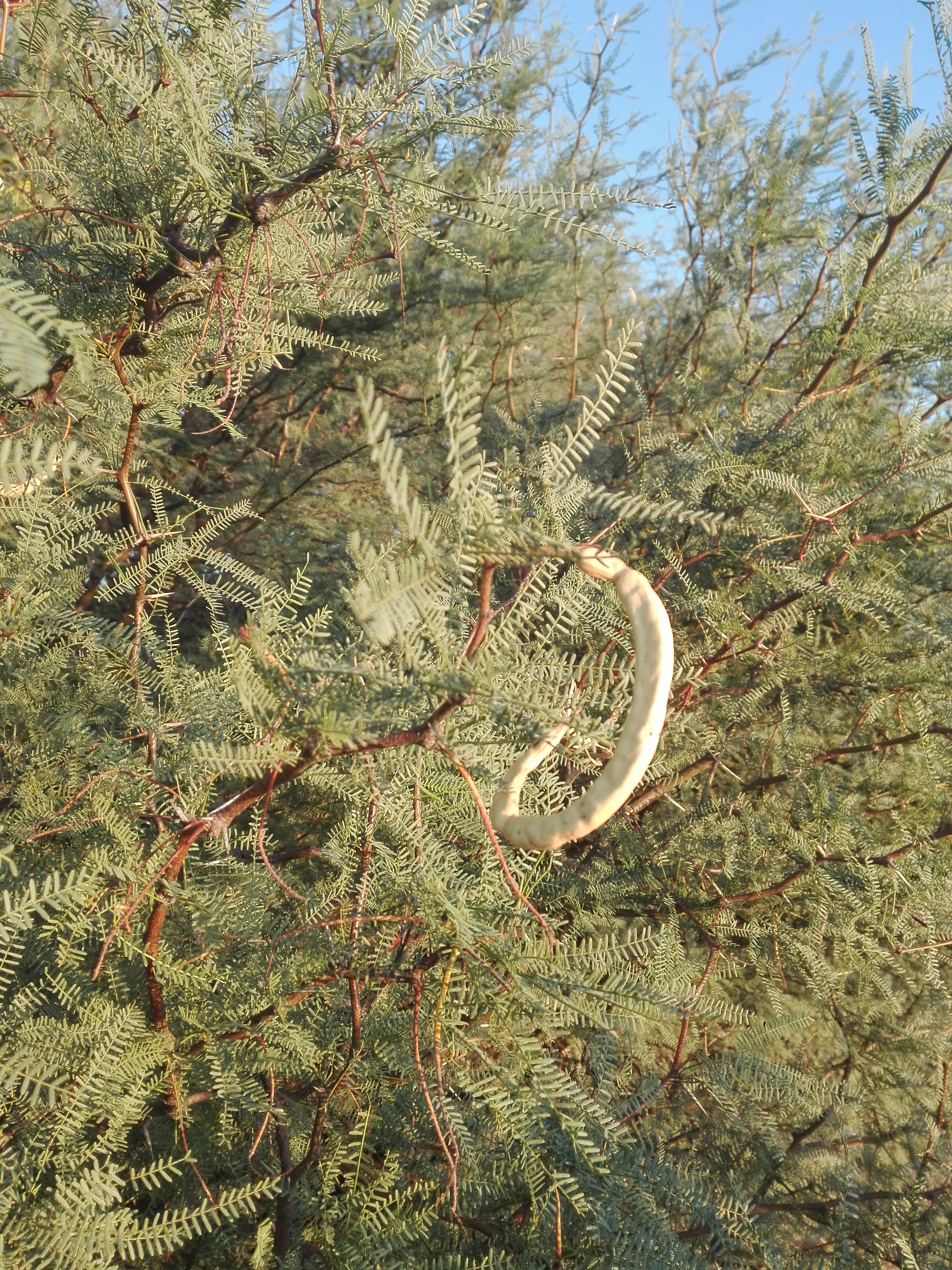
Neltuma alpataco

== Species ==
43 species are accepted:

- Neltuma affinis (Spreng.) C.E.Hughes & G.P.Lewis
- Neltuma alba (Griseb.) C.E.Hughes & G.P.Lewis
- Neltuma alpataco (Phil.) C.E.Hughes & G.P.Lewis
- Neltuma andicola (Burkart) C.E.Hughes & G.P.Lewis
- Neltuma argentina (Burkart) C.E.Hughes & G.P.Lewis
- Neltuma articulata (S.Watson) Britton & Rose
- Neltuma caldenia (Burkart) C.E.Hughes & G.P.Lewis
- Neltuma calderensis (A.Galán, E.Linares, J.Montoya & Vicente Orell.) C.E.Hughes & G.P.Lewis
- Neltuma calingastana (Burkart) C.E.Hughes & G.P.Lewis
- Neltuma campestris (Griseb.) C.E.Hughes & G.P.Lewis
- Neltuma castellanosii (Burkart) C.E.Hughes & G.P.Lewis
- Neltuma chilensis (Molina) C.E.Hughes & G.P.Lewis
- Neltuma denudans (Benth.) C.E.Hughes & G.P.Lewis
- Neltuma elata (Burkart) C.E.Hughes & G.P.Lewis
- Neltuma fiebrigii (Harms) C.E.Hughes & G.P.Lewis
- Neltuma flexuosa (DC.) C.E.Hughes & G.P.Lewis
- Neltuma glandulosa (Torr.) Britton & Rose
- Neltuma hassleri (Harms) C.E.Hughes & G.P.Lewis
- Neltuma humilis (Gillies ex Hook.) C.E.Hughes & G.P.Lewis
- Neltuma juliflora (Sw.) Raf.
- Neltuma kuntzei (Harms) C.E.Hughes & G.P.Lewis
- Neltuma laevigata (Humb. & Bonpl. ex Willd.) Britton & Rose
- Neltuma limensis (Benth.) C.E.Hughes & G.P.Lewis
- Neltuma mantaroensis (L.Vásquez, Escurra & Huamán) C.E.Hughes & G.P.Lewis
- Neltuma mayana (R.A.Palacios) C.E.Hughes & G.P.Lewis
- Neltuma mezcalana (R.A.Palacios) C.E.Hughes & G.P.Lewis
- Neltuma nigra (Griseb.) C.E.Hughes & G.P.Lewis
- Neltuma nuda (Schinini) C.E.Hughes & G.P.Lewis
- Neltuma odorata (Torr. & Frém.) C.E.Hughes & G.P.Lewis
- Neltuma pallida (Humb. & Bonpl. ex Willd.) C.E.Hughes & G.P.Lewis
- Neltuma palmeri Britton & Rose
- Neltuma peruviana (L.Vásquez, Escurra & Huamán) C.E.Hughes & G.P.Lewis
- Neltuma piurensis (L.Vásquez, Escurra & Huamán) C.E.Hughes & G.P.Lewis
- Neltuma pugionata (Burkart) C.E.Hughes & G.P.Lewis
- Neltuma purpurea (L.Vásquez, Escurra & Huamán) C.E.Hughes & G.P.Lewis
- Neltuma rojasiana (Burkart) C.E.Hughes & G.P.Lewis
- Neltuma rubriflora (Hassl.) C.E.Hughes & G.P.Lewis
- Neltuma ruizlealii (Burkart) C.E.Hughes & G.P.Lewis
- Neltuma ruscifolia (Griseb.) C.E.Hughes & G.P.Lewis
- Neltuma sericantha (Gillies ex Hook.) C.E.Hughes & G.P.Lewis
- Neltuma tupayachensis (L.Vásquez, Escurra & Huamán) C.E.Hughes & G.P.Lewis
- Neltuma velutina (Wooton) Britton & Rose
- Neltuma × vinalillo (Stuck.) C.E.Hughes & G.P.Lewis
- Neltuma yaquiana (R.A.Palacios) C.E.Hughes & G.P.Lewis

== Phytochemistry ==
Neltuma species have been found to contain 5-hydroxytryptamine, apigenin, isorhamnetin-3-diglucoside, l-arabinose, quercetin, tannin, and tryptamine.

Neltuma species known to contain alkaloids
Neltuma alba	Beta-phenethylamine and tryptamine
Neltuma alpataco	"Aerial parts" contain tryptamine, phenethylamine derivatives.
Neltuma argentina	"Aerial parts" contain tryptamine, phenethylamine derivatives. Exudate contains tryptamine, phenethylamine derivatives.
Neltuma chilensis	"Aerial parts" contain beta-phenethylamine and derivatives plus tryptamine
Neltuma glandulosa	Alkaloids in bark and roots, tyramine and N-methyltyramine (a stimulant) in leaves
Neltuma juliflora	5-HTP (plant) and tryptamine (plant).
Neltuma nigra	Harman, eleagnine, and N-acetyltryptamine
Neltuma pugionata	"Aerial parts" contain tryptamine, phenethylamine derivatives.

The tannins present in Neltuma species are of the pyrogallotannin and pyrocatecollic types. The tannins are mainly found in the bark and wood, while their concentration in the pods is low.

Some species, such as N. velutina, produce a gum (mesquite gum).

== As an introduced and invasive species ==
The species Neltuma pallida was introduced to Hawaii in 1828 and now dominates many of the drier coastal parts of the islands, where it is called the kiawe tree and is a prime source of monofloral honey production.

In Australia, invasive Neltuma species are causing severe economic and environmental damage. With their thorns and many low branches, Neltuma shrubs form impenetrable thickets which prevent cattle from accessing watering holes, etc. They also take over pastoral grasslands and suck up scarce water. Neltuma species cause land erosion due to loss of grassland that are habitats for native plants and animals. Neltuma thickets also provide shelter for feral animals such as pigs and cats.

=== Eradication ===
Eradicating Neltuma is difficult because the plant's bud regeneration zone can extend down to 6 in (150 mm) below ground level; the tree can regenerate from a piece of root left in the soil. Some herbicides are not effective or only partially effective against mesquite. Spray techniques for removal, while effective against short-term regrowth, are expensive, costing more than $70/acre ($170/hectare) in the USA. Removing large trees requires tracked equipment; costs can approach $2,000 per acre. In Australia, several techniques are used to remove Neltuma.

== See also ==
- Invasive species in Australia
