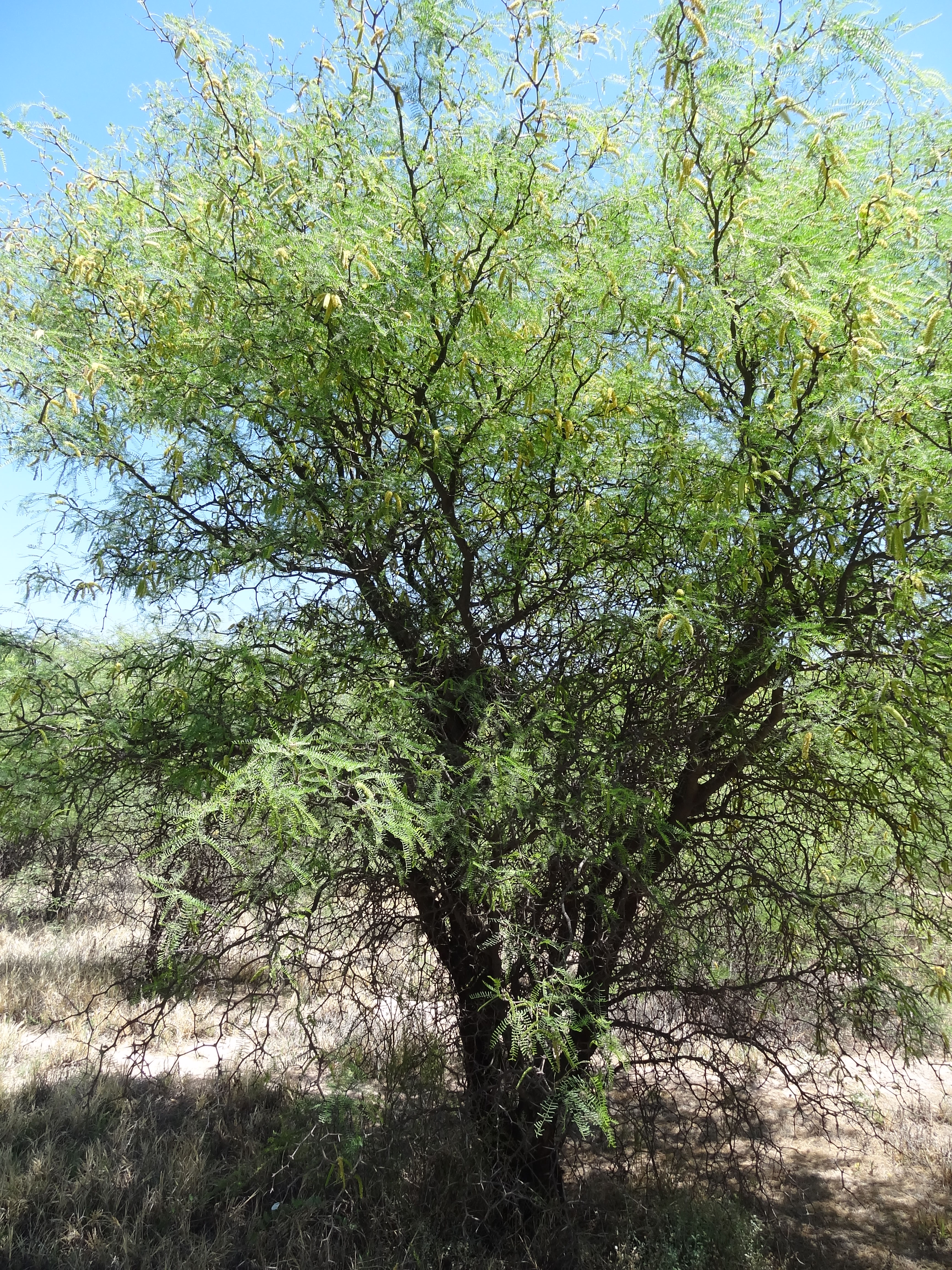

Conservation status
- Least Concern (IUCN 3.1)

Scientific classification
- Kingdom: Plantae
- Clade: Tracheophytes
- Clade: Angiosperms
- Clade: Eudicots
- Clade: Rosids
- Order: Fabales
- Family: Fabaceae
- Subfamily: Caesalpinioideae
- Clade: Mimosoid clade
- Genus: Neltuma
- Species: N. flexuosa

Binomial name
- Neltuma flexuosa (DC.) C.E.Hughes & G.P.Lewis

Synonyms
- Prosopis flexuosa

= Neltuma flexuosa =

Species of legume

Neltuma flexuosa (formerly Prosopis flexuosa), commonly known as tortuous mesquite and a variety of Spanish vernacular names including algarrobo dulce and algarrobo negro, is a species of flowering tree in the genus Neltuma of the family Fabaceae. It is found in arid and semi-arid regions of Argentina, Bolivia and Chile, including the western Gran Chaco and the Monte Desert, where it is a conspicuous and characteristic plant of the region. Its timber is used for construction, charcoal and fuel and its fruits are eaten by humans and livestock.

== Description ==
Neltuma flexuosa has several varieties exhibiting different growth forms, appearing either as trees (arboreal form) or shrubs. The arboreal form, Neltuma flexuosa var. flexuosa is a medium-sized, deciduous tree growing to a height of up to 10 m (33 ft). It has a short trunk and long branches which often grow horizontally and turn up at the ends. The shrub forms (var. depressa and fruticosa) consist of numerous branches reaching heights of 2.5 to 5 m (8 ft 2 in to 16 ft 5 in) The leaves have stems and are up to 15 cm (6 in) long. They are somewhat leathery and are pinnate with nine to seventeen pairs of leaflets. A pair (occasionally one) of strong thorns 6 cm (2 in) long grow in the axils of each leaf.

The flowers are in dense racemes 6 to 14 cm (2 to 6 in) long each containing about two hundred yellowish individual flowers. They are followed by long yellow pods with purplish blotches, which have twisted margins and contain a variable number of seeds. The sugar content of the seeds varies with the soil conditions and the area in which the tree is grown but the seeds are usually sweet, though sometimes bitter.

There are significant differences in seed form between populations in the north (e.g. Chilecito, Fiambalá and Pipanaco) and in the south (e.g. San Rafael).

== Distribution and habitat ==
Neltuma flexuosa is endemic to arid regions of South America. Its range includes western Argentina, northern Chile and possibly the southern part of Bolivia. Its altitudinal range is from sea level to about 2,200 m (7,218 ft). It has two types of habitat, lowland dry forests and gallery forests. The annual rainfall within its range varies between about 50 and 500 millimetres (2.0 and 19.7 in). The tree is tolerant of drought, cold, salt and sand and is the hardiest species in its genus. It is extremely efficient with water consumption, producing most of its fruits in drought years, and has been successfully introduced into other arid regions.

== Ecology ==
The rainy season normally starts in November and new foliage appears in early spring, irrespective of the actual arrival of the rains. The leaves may not be shed at all in mild winters. In more humid areas, the predominant species is the white quebracho (Aspidosperma quebracho-blanco), followed by N. flexuosa, chaparral (Larrea divaricata), Mimozyganthus carinatus and Acacia furcatispina. Under more arid conditions, N. flexuosa may predominate in open woodland with the Chilean greenwood (Geoffroea decorticans) and an understorey of caperbush (Capparis atamisquea), saltbush (Atriplex lampa) and seablite (Suaeda divaricata) also being present. The flowers produce large quantities of pollen and nectar and are beloved by bees, which also pollinate them.

== Uses ==
The wood is dense and hard to nail. It is used for livestock fencing and the poles for vineyards, for joinery, for the production of charcoal and for firewood. The fruits have a high nutritional content and are eaten by local people and fed to livestock. This tree is favoured by beekeepers for the production of honey.
