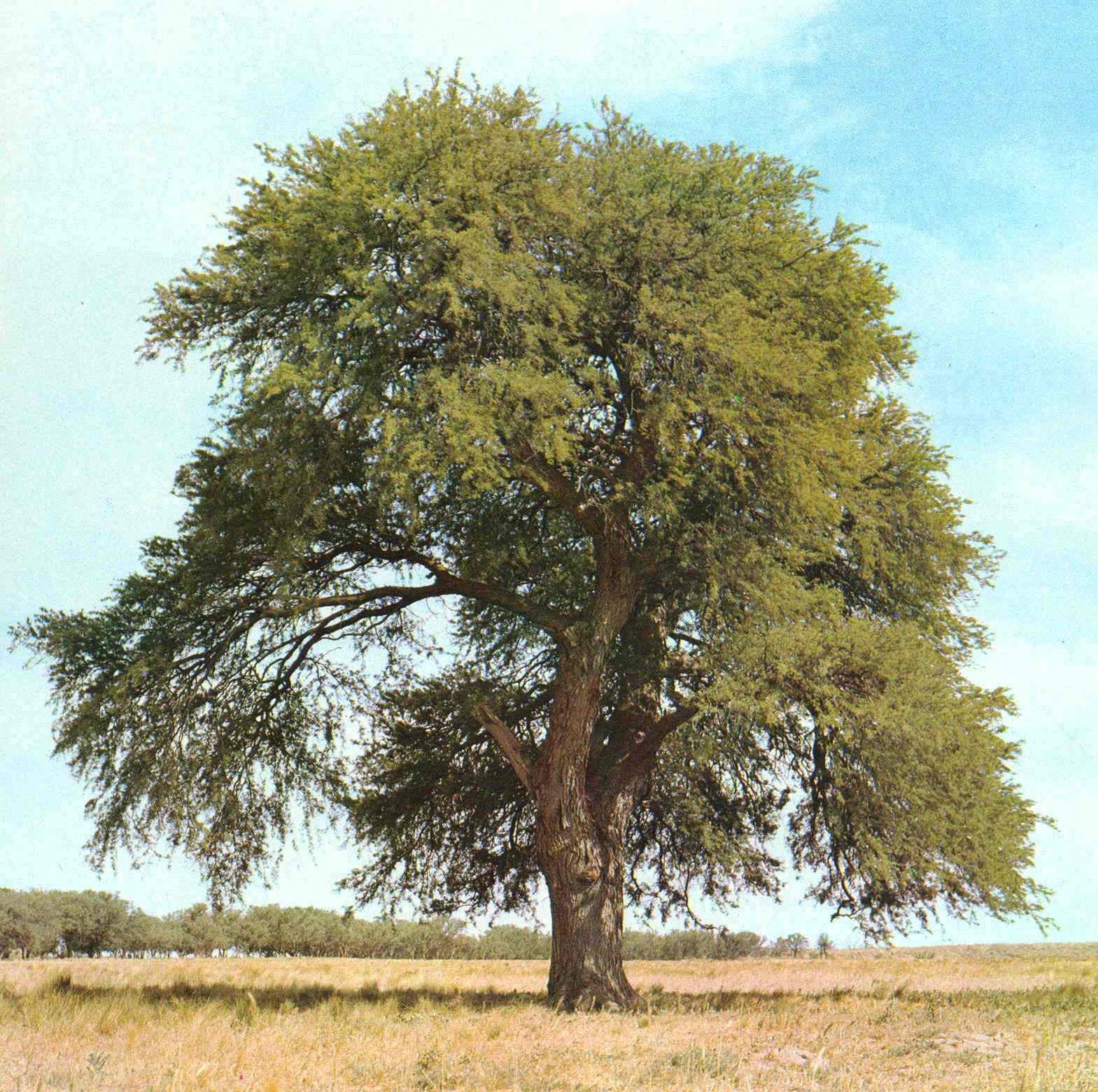

Conservation status
- Data Deficient (IUCN 2.3)

Scientific classification
- Kingdom: Plantae
- Clade: Tracheophytes
- Clade: Angiosperms
- Clade: Eudicots
- Clade: Rosids
- Order: Fabales
- Family: Fabaceae
- Subfamily: Caesalpinioideae
- Clade: Mimosoid clade
- Genus: Neltuma
- Species: N. caldenia

Binomial name
- Neltuma caldenia (Burkart) C.E.Hughes & G.P.Lewis

Synonyms
- Prosopis caldenia

= Neltuma caldenia =

Species of legume

Neltuma caldenia (formerly Prosopis caldenia), commonly known as the caldén, is a species of flowering tree in the family Fabaceae. The tree is endemic to subtropical regions of Argentina. It thrives in sandy and arid soil and resists drought, developing an extremely deep root system. The leaves of this tree are pinnately compound, deciduous, alternate and small. Its foliage is tortuous, with conical spines arranged in pairs at the nodes.
