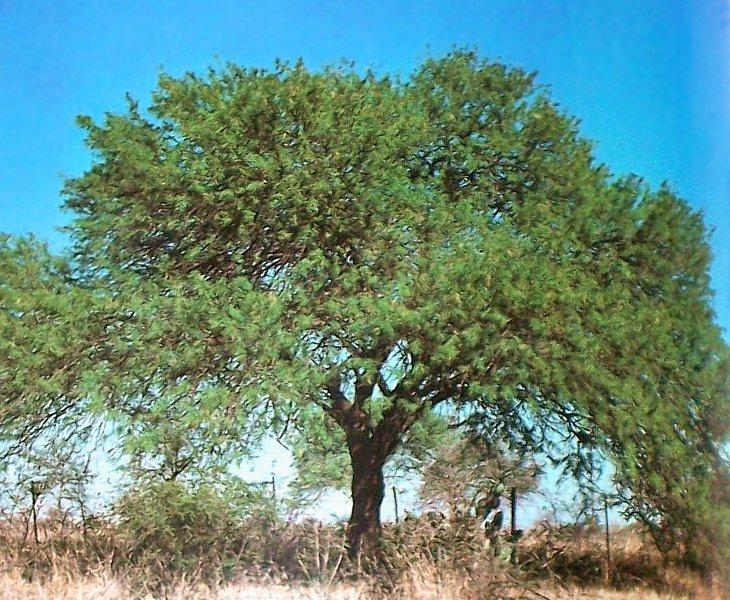

Conservation status
- Data Deficient (IUCN 2.3)

Scientific classification
- Kingdom: Plantae
- Clade: Tracheophytes
- Clade: Angiosperms
- Clade: Eudicots
- Clade: Rosids
- Order: Fabales
- Family: Fabaceae
- Subfamily: Caesalpinioideae
- Clade: Mimosoid clade
- Genus: Neltuma
- Species: N. nigra

Binomial name
- Neltuma nigra (Griseb.) C.E.Hughes & G.P.Lewis

Synonyms
- Prosopis_nigra; Prosopis algarrobilla'

= Neltuma nigra =

Species of tree

Neltuma nigra (formerly Prosopis nigra) is a South American leguminous tree species that inhabits the Gran Chaco ecoregion (in particular, the transition zone between the Wet Chaco and the Southern Chaco), in Argentina and Paraguay. It is known as algarrobo negro in Spanish, which means "black carob tree" (the Spanish settlers gave it that name, as they did with many other species of genus Prosopis, because of its similarity to the European carob tree). It is also variously called algarrobo dulce, algarrobo morado and algarrobo amarillo ("sweet", "purple" and "yellow" carob tree, respectively).

The tree blossoms in September and October, and gives fruit from November to March. It grows together with the vinalillo tree (Prosopis vinalillo) and under the tops of the palm tree Copernicia alba. Like the other species of this genus, it tolerates arid climate, but can also survive in flooded ground for a long time. The heartwood is dark brown and very heavy, considered noble by local carpenters, also weather resistant, it presents streaks.

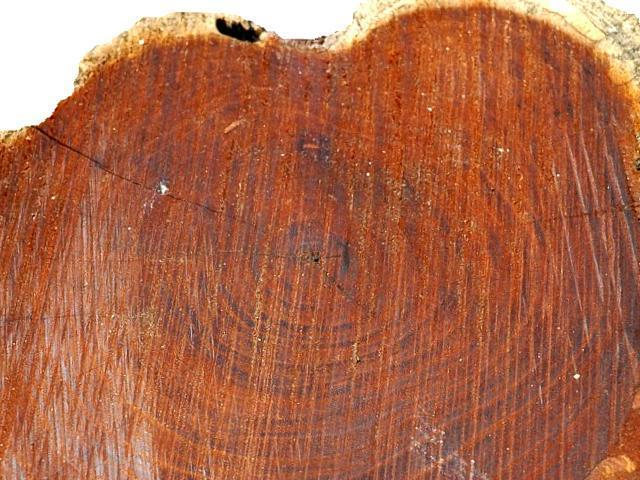
Detail of timber from Prosopis nigra

== Usage ==
Algarrobo negro wood is used in making furniture and barrels. High in tannin, it has been employed for leather tanning since the colonial era. Its fruit, called an algarroba, is a dehiscent-type pod, with a sweet, starchy paste inside, milled to make flour, and fermented to make an alcoholic beverage.

== Sources ==
- Commercial timbers: descriptions, illustrations, identification, and information retrieval - H. G. Richter and M. J. Dallwitz
- Catálogo Web de especies forestales - Facultad de Ciencias Agrarias, Universidad Nacional de Asunción (in Spanish)
