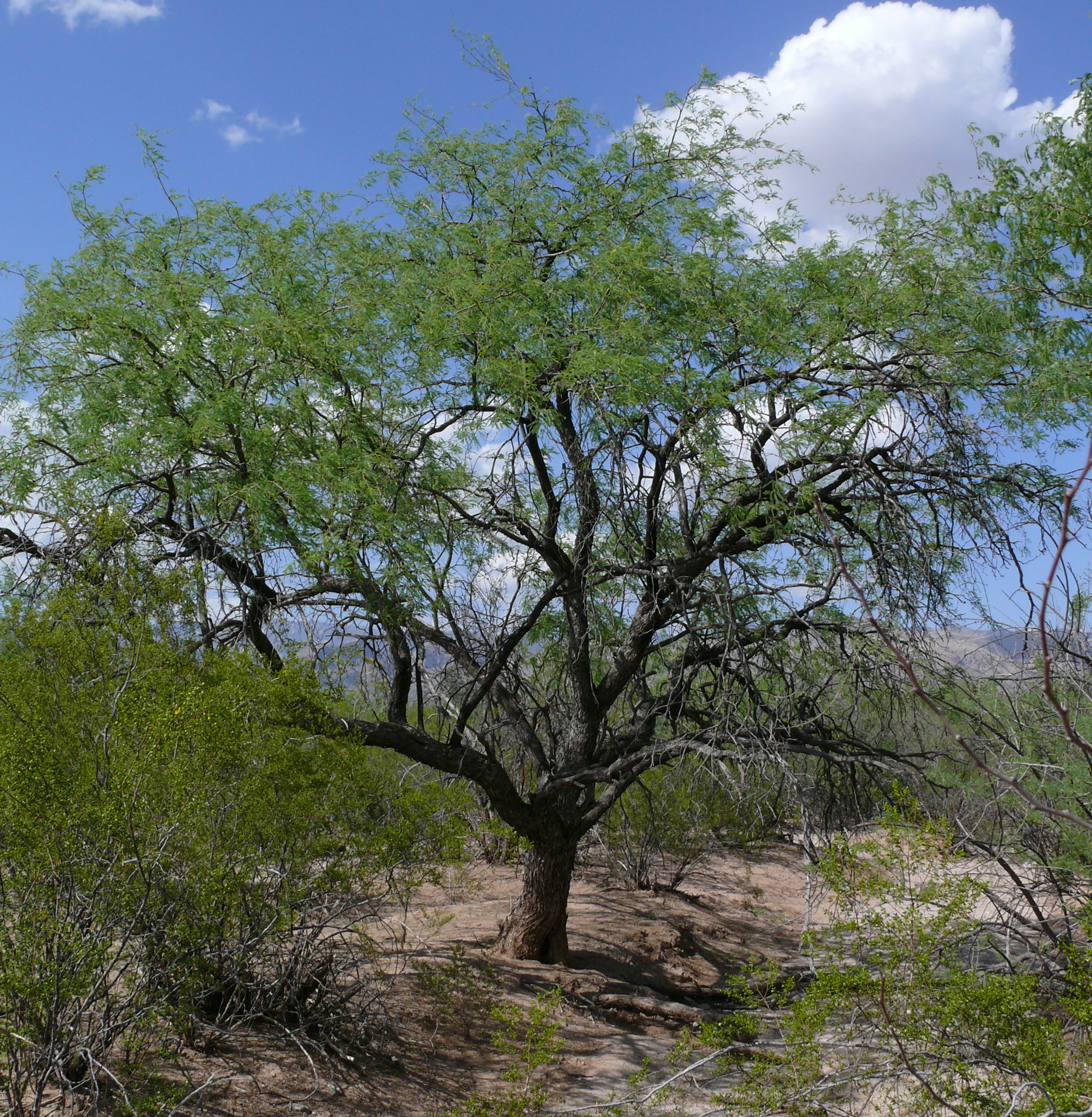

Conservation status
- Least Concern (IUCN 3.1)

Scientific classification
- Kingdom: Plantae
- Clade: Tracheophytes
- Clade: Angiosperms
- Clade: Eudicots
- Clade: Rosids
- Order: Fabales
- Family: Fabaceae
- Subfamily: Caesalpinioideae
- Clade: Mimosoid clade
- Genus: Neltuma
- Species: N. velutina

Binomial name
- Neltuma velutina (Wooton) Britton & Rose

= Neltuma velutina =

Species of tree

Neltuma velutina (formerly Prosopis velutina), commonly known as velvet mesquite, is a small to medium-sized tree. It is a legume adapted to a dry, desert climate. Though considered to be a noxious weed in states outside its natural range, it plays a vital role in the ecology of the Sonoran Desert.

== Distribution ==
The velvet mesquite is native to the Sonoran, Mojave, and Chihuahuan Deserts. It grows at elevations below 4,000 to 5,000 feet (1,200 to 1,500 m) in desert grasslands and near washes. The main distribution is in central and southern Arizona and in adjacent Sonora, Mexico. Near waterways, mesquites can form deciduous woodlands called bosques.

== Description ==
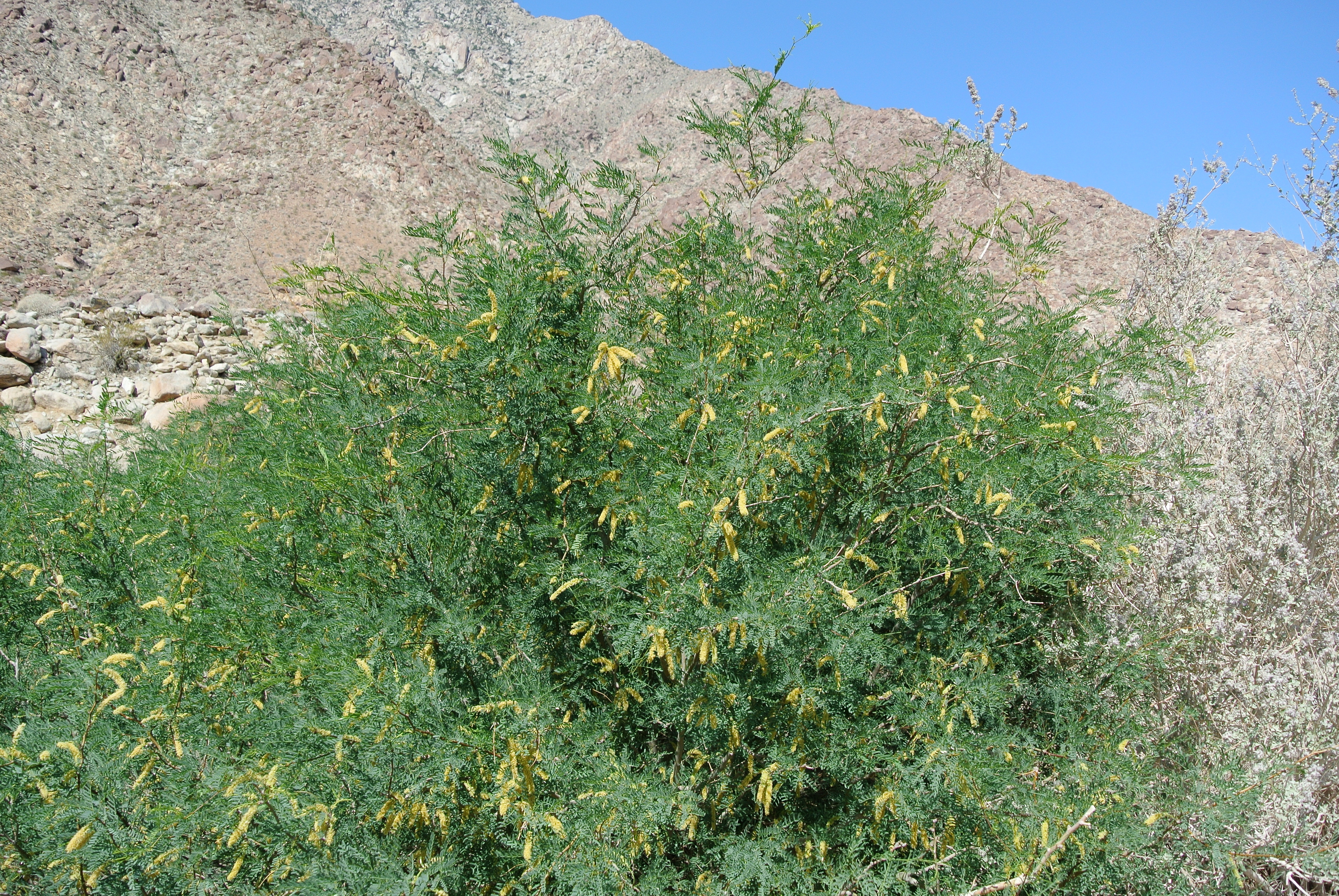
Blossoming velvet mesquite in Anza-Borrego Desert State Park

Velvet mesquite can grow to 30–50 ft (9–15 m) tall or more. It grows larger in areas with ample water, smaller in open, dry grasslands. The youngest branches may be green and photosynthetic. Young bark is reddish-brown and smooth. As it matures, it becomes a dark, dusty gray or brown and takes on a shredded texture. Yellow thorns up to one inch long appear on the young branches. The leaves are about 3–6 in (7.5–15 cm) long, fine, and bipinnately compound. They fold closed at night.

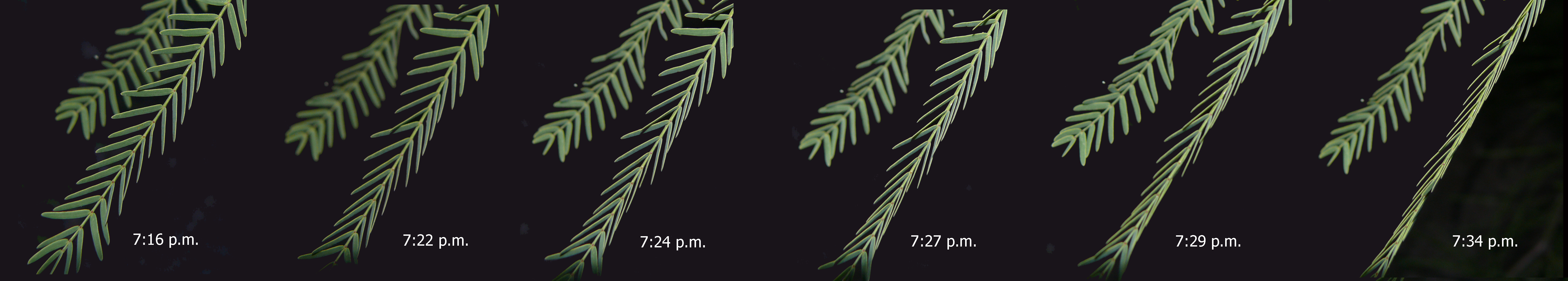
Composite image of velvet mesquite leaves folding up in the evening in response to decreasing light levels

The taproot sinks deep into the earth, far deeper than the height of the tree, taking advantage of water sources inaccessible to most plants. Roots extend to about 50 ft (15 m), but depths as much as 175 ft (53 m) have been recorded.

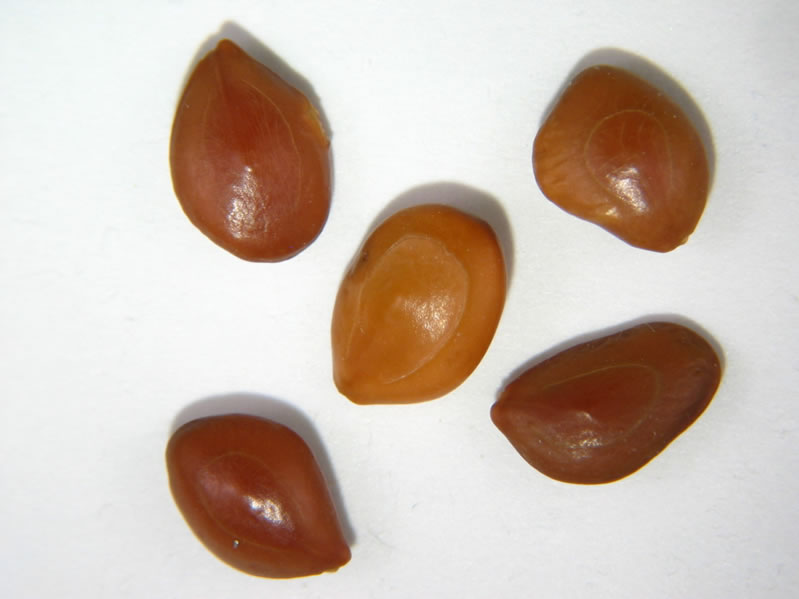
Velvet mesquite seeds

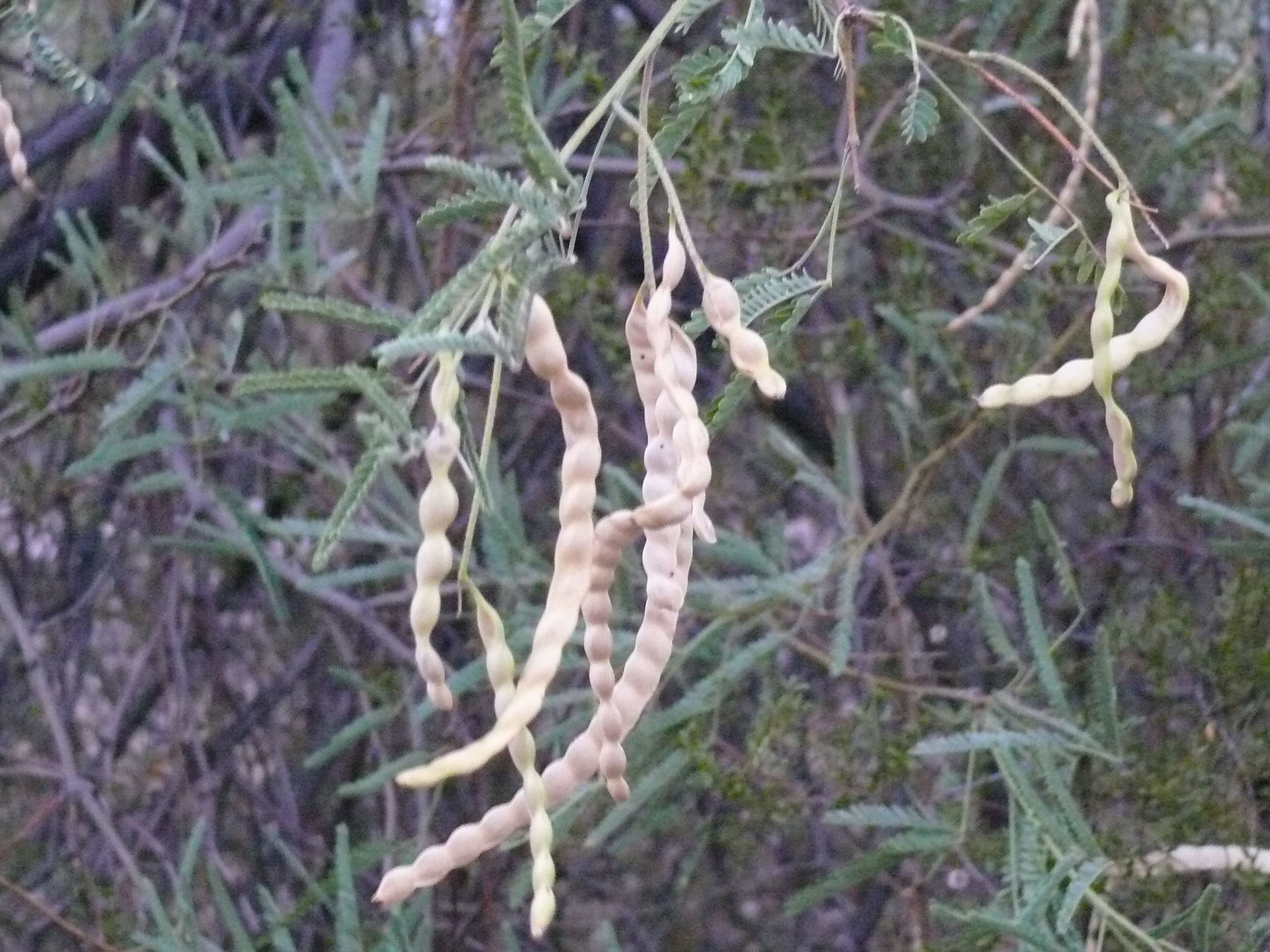
Dry velvet mesquite seedpods

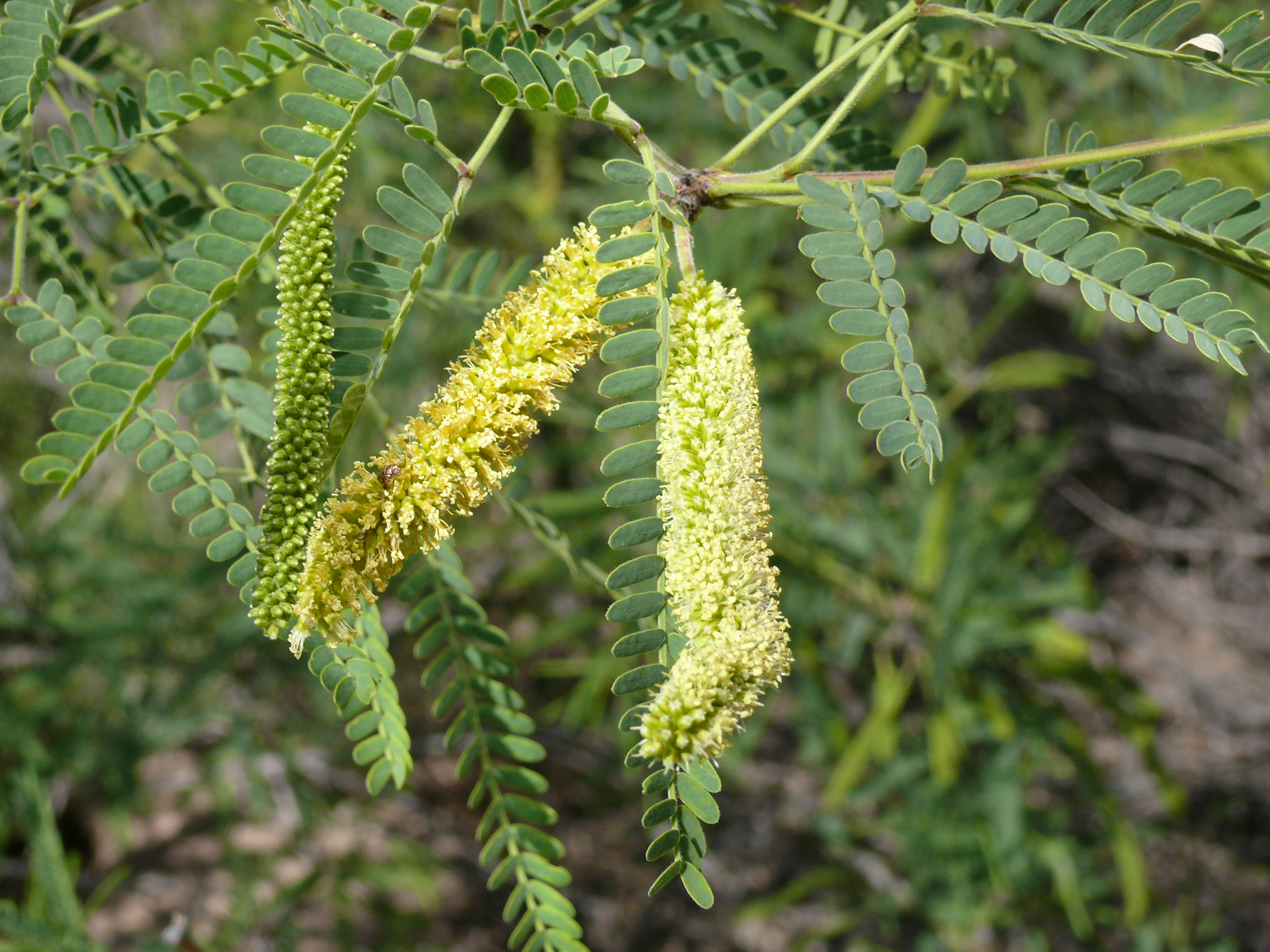
Flowering velvet mesquite catkins

The mesquite is deciduous, losing its leaves in winter, and leafs out again in the spring when all danger of frost is past. Because of its deep root system, it keeps its leaves in the dry months of summer in all but the most severe drought years. The flowers are yellow and form in the spring (after the leaves) in dense cylindrical clusters (catkins) roughly 4 in (10 cm) long. Long seedpods (legumes) form from the flowers. They are bright green and look somewhat like pea pods when young. Mature, dry pods are hard and contain several hard, dry, brown seeds. The seeds need to be scarified before they can germinate. This scarification typically takes place in the digestive tracts of animals, which eat the seeds and then disperse them widely, as the seed takes days to pass through the animal.

== Ecology ==
The mesquite contributes greatly to the desert ecosystem. Coyotes, round-tailed ground squirrels, collared peccaries, mule deer, white-tailed deer, and jackrabbits all eat mesquite pods, as do livestock when they are available. Birds feed on the flower buds. As a member of the legume family, mesquites fix nitrogen in the soil. Mesquites can serve as nurse trees to young cacti, such as the saguaro. The shade of its branches provides protection for small mammals, especially burrowing animals. Native Americans used the seeds for food, grinding them into a flour. The bark was used for baskets and fabrics and the wood for firewood and building. The leaves and gum were used as medicine.

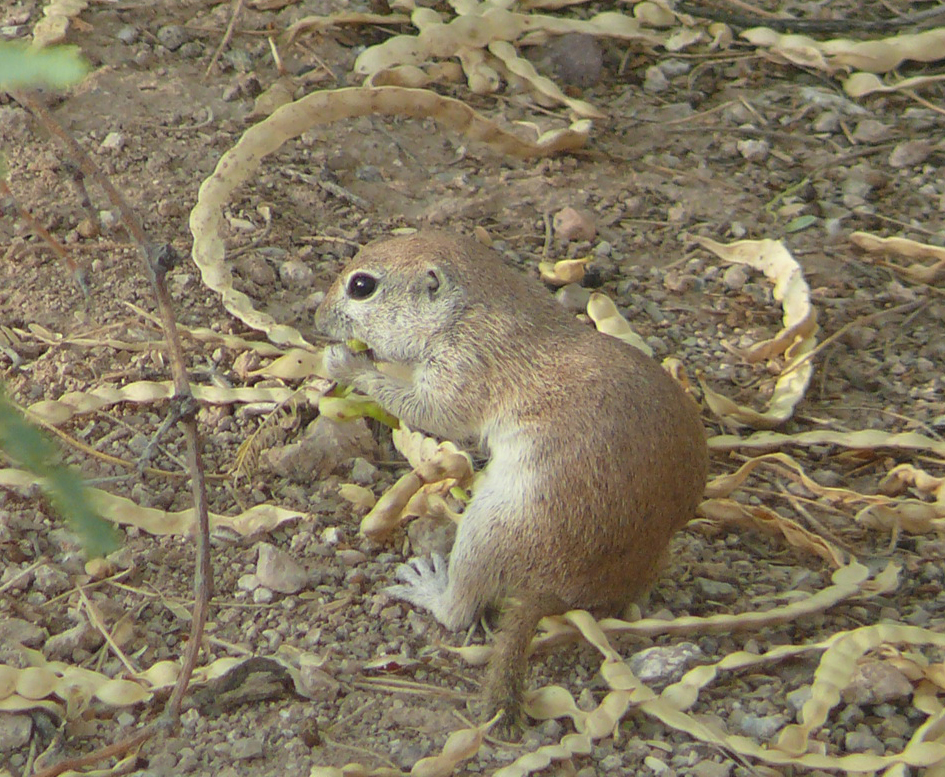
A round-tailed ground squirrel eating velvet mesquite pods

The range of the velvet mesquite has changed because of grazing. Cattle not only dispersed mesquite seeds, but they also overgrazed the land, resulting in fewer range fires to control the mesquite population. Mesquites grew more densely and spread into what had been grassland. Consequently, velvet mesquite is considered an invasive species or noxious weed in several states. However, mesquite bosques cover only a small fraction of the area they covered before human settlement. Agriculture, firewood cutting, housing developments, and the lowering of the water table have all contributed to the loss of native mesquite stands.

== Uses ==
- Velvet mesquite is a common choice for residential and commercial xeriscaping in Tucson and Phoenix, cities which are inside its natural range. An established mesquite tree needs little or no watering, and is an attractive ornamental plant.
- Medicinal uses: Sore throats were treated with a hot tea made from a blend of the clear sap plus inner red bark. Stomachaches were treated with a tea made from the fresh leaves. Toothache was treated by chewing the soft inner bark of the root. For flagging appetite, a tea made from the dried leaves was taken before meals.
- Cosmetic uses: Most important to a select number of folks was mesquite's use against hair loss. This treatment was used by men only, and consisted of the black sap that oozes from mesquite wounds (not the clear sap) mixed with other secret herbs and applied to the scalp. Special mesquite herbal soap for "macho" hair is still available in parts of Mexico.
- Bark was used for baskets and fabrics.
- Wood is important for firewood and for flavor when grilling meat.

== Food ==
Mesquite pods are an important source of food for humans as well as native wildlife. Pods are considered a slow-release food due to galactomannin gums which have been found to lower glycemic responses. Their glycemic index is 25%, compared to 60% for sweet corn, and 100% for white sugar.

Dried and toasted, the pods are ground into mesquite meal and mesquite flour. Both flour and meal are used to make cakes, breads, muffins, and pancakes.

== See also ==
- Mesquite Bosque
