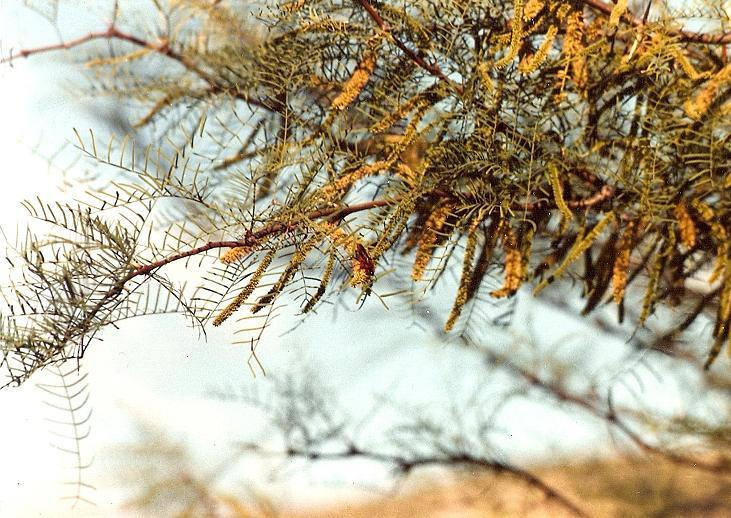

Conservation status
- Least Concern (IUCN 3.1)

Scientific classification
- Kingdom: Plantae
- Clade: Tracheophytes
- Clade: Angiosperms
- Clade: Eudicots
- Clade: Rosids
- Order: Fabales
- Family: Fabaceae
- Subfamily: Caesalpinioideae
- Clade: Mimosoid clade
- Genus: Neltuma
- Species: N. chilensis

Binomial name
- Neltuma chilensis (Molina) C.E.Hughes & G.P.Lewis

= Neltuma chilensis =

Species of legume

Neltuma chilensis (formerly Prosopis chilensis) is a species of tree in the family Fabaceae. It is found in parts of central Chile, southern Peru, Bolivia, and Andean (northwestern) Argentina. Its common names include Chilean mesquite (algarrobo chileno, in Spanish), cupesí (in eastern Bolivia), and Chilean algarrobo. It is used for providing shade, for animal feed, and firewood.

== Description ==
Neltuma chilensis is a medium-sized deciduous tree, reaching a height of about 14 m (46 ft). The trunk is stout and gnarled, and can reach a metre (yard) in diameter. The bark is pale brown and thick, exhibiting cracks and vertical fissures. The leaves are pinnate, up to 20 cm (8 in) long, with twelve to twenty leaflets arranged in pairs. Each leaflet is oval with a smooth margin and a yellowish green upper surface. A pair of strong, curved thorns is borne at the location of each whorl of leaves. The flowers are borne in dense axillary spikes, with each individual flower having five sepals, five petals, and ten stamens. The fruits are twisted or coiled pods, up to 15 cm (6 in) long, containing several coffee-coloured seeds inside. N. chilensis flowers between October and December, and the fruits ripen between February and April.

== Distribution and habitat ==
Neltuma chilensis is found in Peru, Bolivia, eastern Argentina, and central Chile, growing on light soils in arid regions. It is highly drought-resistant and likely fixes nitrogen. It has been introduced into Hawaii, where it is now commonly found growing in thickets behind beaches.

== Uses ==
Neltuma chilensis is used as a shade tree and for firewood. The leaves are used as fodder for livestock and the pods and seeds are of high nutritive value and are ground to make an animal feed. Honey bees, and several other species of bee, pollinate the flowers.
