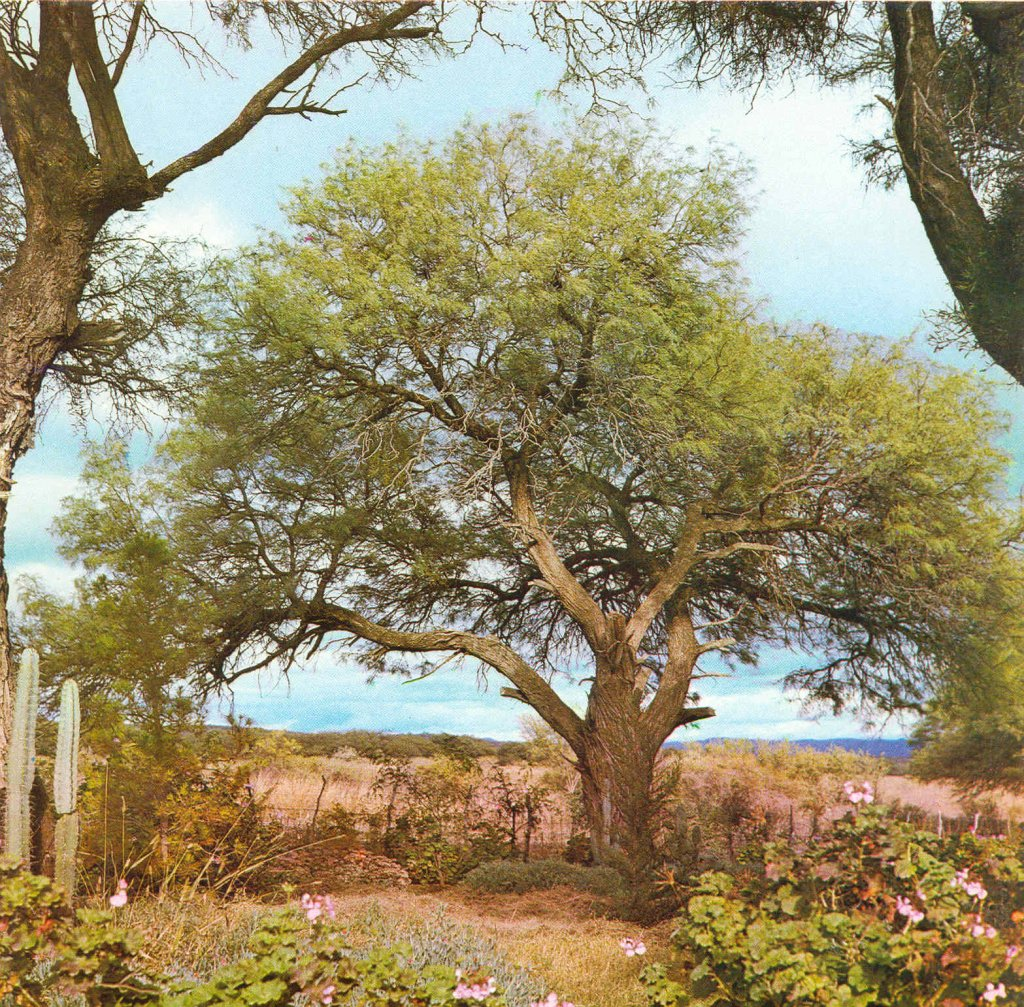

Conservation status
- Near Threatened (IUCN 2.3)

Scientific classification
- Kingdom: Plantae
- Clade: Tracheophytes
- Clade: Angiosperms
- Clade: Eudicots
- Clade: Rosids
- Order: Fabales
- Family: Fabaceae
- Subfamily: Caesalpinioideae
- Clade: Mimosoid clade
- Genus: Neltuma
- Species: N. alba

Binomial name
- Neltuma alba (Griseb.) C.E.Hughes & G.P.Lewis

Varieties
- Neltuma alba var. alba; Neltuma alba var. panta (Griseb.) C.E.Hughes & G.P.Lewis

Synonyms
- Prosopis alba Griseb.

= Neltuma alba =

Species of tree

Neltuma alba (formerly Prosopis alba) is a South American tree species that grows in central Argentina, the Gran Chaco ecoregion, and part of the Argentine Mesopotamia, as well as Bolivia, Chile, Paraguay, and Peru. It is known as algarrobo blanco ('white carob tree' or "white algarrobo") in Spanish. Spanish settlers gave it that name because of its similarity to the European carob tree (Ceratonia siliqua). Other common names come from Guaraní, including ibopé and igopé.

Neltuma alba is a medium-sized tree, measuring between 5 and 15 m (16 and 49 ft), in height and 1 m (3.3 ft) in diameter, though such tall specimens occur very rarely at present. The trunk is short and the treetop is globular, sometimes reaching 10 m (33 ft) in diameter. The bark is thin, brown-grayish in colour, with streaks, and it has tanning properties.

The tree is employed for ornamental and utilitary roadside planting and windbreaks. Its timber, which is rather dense (relative density = 0.76) and difficult to work, is used for doors and floors, for furniture, for paving blocks, shoe lasts and wine casks (where it replaces the European oak). The wood responds well to drying and is therefore valuable for work that requires stable dimensions regardless of humidity. It is also durable for outdoor use.

The flowers are small, greenish-white or yellowish, and bisexual. Pollination, mediated by wind and insects, is allogamous (crossed), since the female reproductive organs are turned active before the male ones.

The fruits are modified seedpods, 20 cm (7.9 in) long, with brown seeds about 7 mm (0.28 in) long. They contain a sweet floury paste (patay), very high in energy, that can be used for fodder or turned into flour for human consumption. In the 1940s a mildly intoxicating beverage called aloja was made from it through fermentation; in turn it was sometimes distilled to produce ethanol. Between half and three quarters of the fruit's weight is sugar.

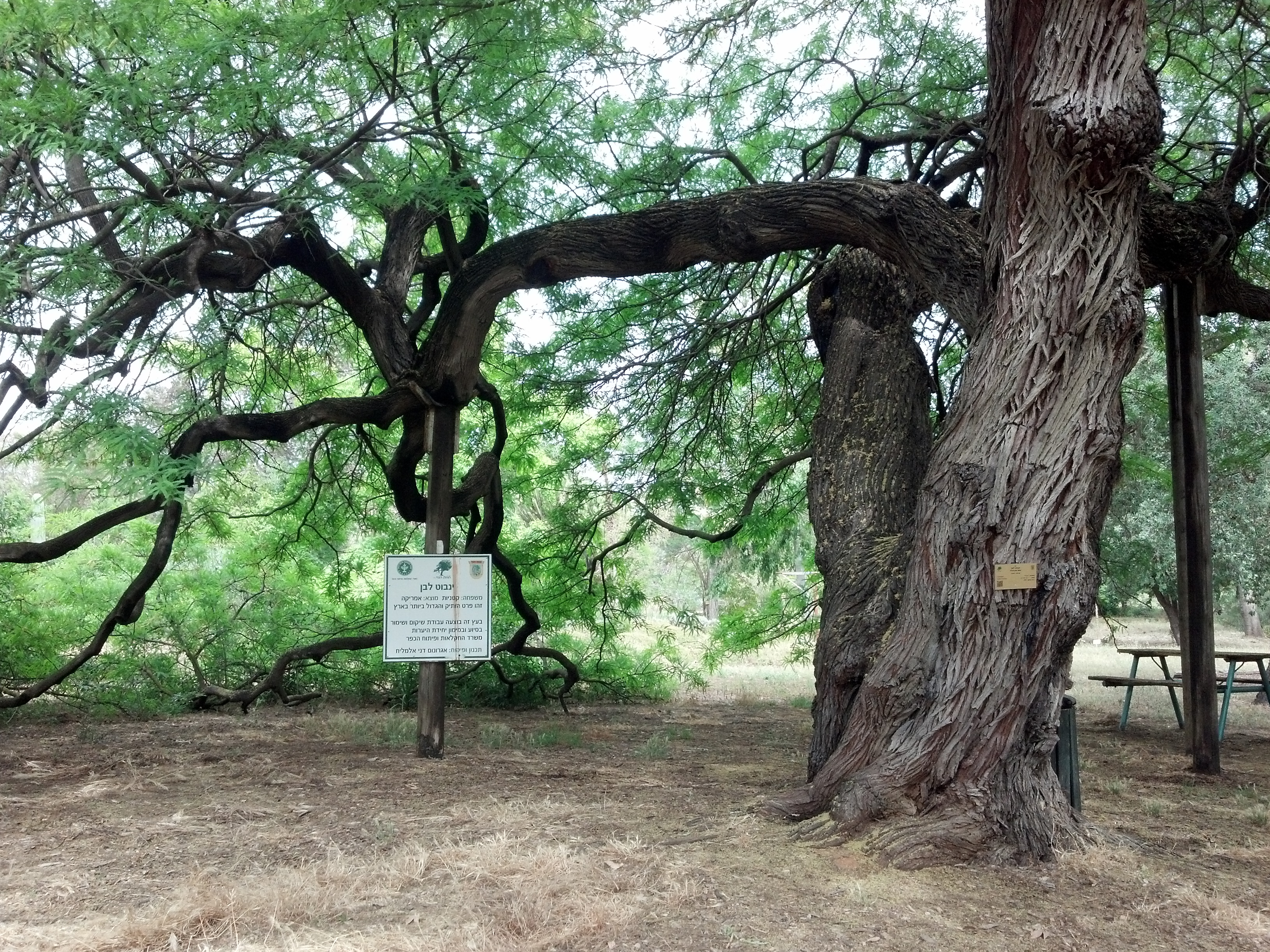
In a Botanical garden in Israel

The tree can reportedly tolerate drought, salt and sand; in fact, it is extremely efficient with regard to water consumption, it produces the most fruits in years of drought and has been successfully introduced in arid terrains. However, it cannot stand even mild frost.

Neltuma alba and other algarrobo species in genus Prosopis, such as algarrobo negro (P. nigra), are often confused or not correctly distinguished in botanical literature; in part this is due to the ease of hybridization of the genus.

Two varieties are accepted:

- Neltuma alba var. alba (synonyms Prosopis atacamensis Phil. and Prosopis siliquastrum var. longisiliqua Phil.) – northern Argentina, Bolivia, northern Chile, Paraguay, and Peru
- Neltuma alba var. panta (Griseb.) C.E.Hughes & G.P.Lewis (synonyms Prosopis alba var. panta Griseb. and Prosopis panta (Griseb.) Hieron.) – northern Argentina, Paraguay, and Peru
