= Eumichthini =

Scientific classification
- Domain: Eukaryota
- Kingdom: Animalia
- Phylum: Arthropoda
- Class: Insecta
- Order: Coleoptera
- Suborder: Polyphaga
- Infraorder: Cucujiformia
- Family: Cerambycidae
- Subfamily: Cerambycinae
- Tribe: Eumichthini; Linsley, 1940

Tribe of beetles

Eumichthini is a tribe of beetles in the subfamily Cerambycinae, containing the following genera and species:

- Genus Eumichthus
  - Eumichthus oedipus LeConte, 1873
- Genus Poecilobrium
  - Poecilobrium chalybeum (LeConte, 1873)
