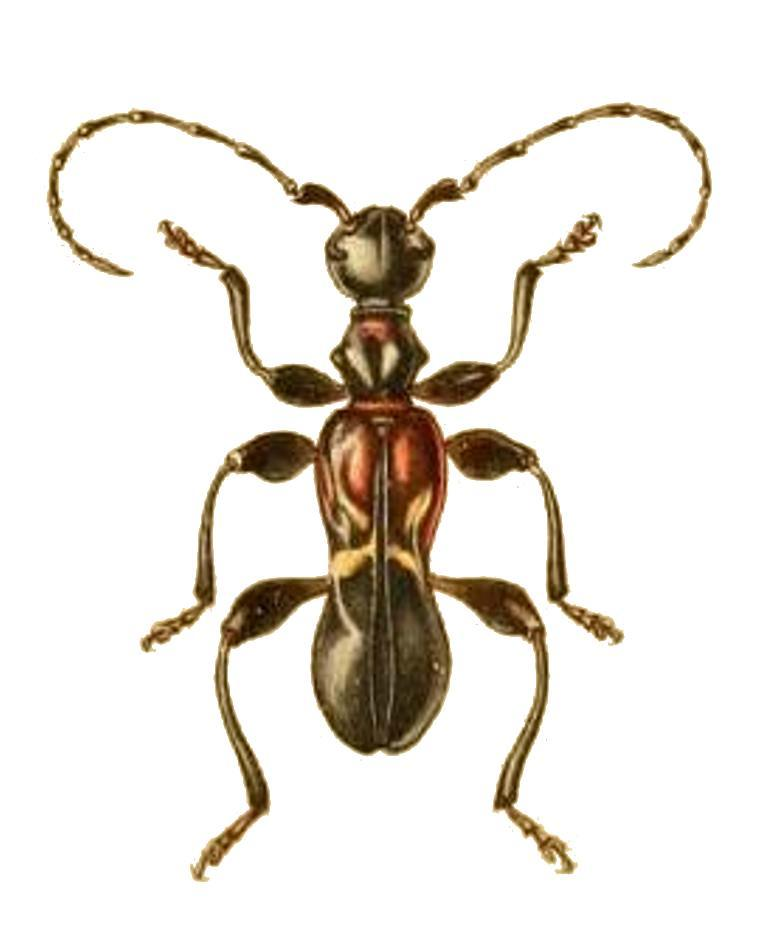
- Cyclocranium swierstrae

Scientific classification
- Domain: Eukaryota
- Kingdom: Animalia
- Phylum: Arthropoda
- Class: Insecta
- Order: Coleoptera
- Suborder: Polyphaga
- Infraorder: Cucujiformia
- Family: Cerambycidae
- Subfamily: Cerambycinae
- Tribe: Pseudocephalini
- Genus: Cyclocranium; Neervort Van de Poll, 1891
- Species: C. swierstrae

Binomial name
- Cyclocranium swierstrae Neervort Van de Poll, 1891

= Cyclocranium =

Genus of beetles

Cyclocranium is a genus of beetles in the long-horned beetle family and the tribe Pseudocephalini. It contains a single species, Cyclocranium swierstrae.

They are most commonly found in Australia. Their diet consists of Eucalyptus grandis.
