= Agallissus lepturoides =

Scientific classification
- Kingdom: Animalia
- Phylum: Arthropoda
- Class: Insecta
- Order: Coleoptera
- Suborder: Polyphaga
- Infraorder: Cucujiformia
- Family: Cerambycidae
- Subfamily: Cerambycinae
- Tribe: Agallissini
- Genus: Agallissus
- Species: A. lepturoides

Binomial name
- Agallissus lepturoides (Chevrolat, 1849)

Synonyms
- Agallissus clytoides Lacordaire, 1869; Agallissus gratus LeConte & Horn, 1883; Agallisus lepturoides Hovore, Penrose & Neck, 1987; Aplectrus lepturoides Chevrolat, 1849; Cryptopleura grata Haldeman, 1854

Species of beetle

Agallissus lepturoides is a species of longhorn beetle in the Cerambycinae subfamily. It was described by Chevrolat in 1844. It is known from Texas, USA, Mexico and Honduras. The beetle's host plant is Sabal mexicana, and larvae can be found in S. mexicana stems.
