= Monneella =

Scientific classification
- Kingdom: Animalia
- Phylum: Arthropoda
- Class: Insecta
- Order: Coleoptera
- Suborder: Polyphaga
- Infraorder: Cucujiformia
- Family: Cerambycidae
- Subfamily: Cerambycinae
- Tribe: Dodecosini
- Genus: Monneella; Martins, 1985
- Species: M. bicolor

Binomial name
- Monneella bicolor Martins, 1985

Species of beetle

Monneella bicolor is a species of beetle in the family Cerambycidae. It was described by Martins in 1985. It is the only species in the genus Monneella.
