= Hephaestion (disambiguation) =

Hephaestion (356 BC–324 BC) was Alexander's celebrated friend and general.

Hephaestion or Hephaistion may also refer to:

- Hephaestion (beetle), a genus of beetles
- Hephaestion (grammarian) of Alexandria, who flourished in the age of the Antonines
- Hephestion (horse) (foaled 1807), a British Thoroughbred racehorse
- Hephaestion of Thebes, 5th century astrologer

== See also ==
- Hephaestin, a protein involved in the metabolism and homeostasis of iron
- Hephaesteion, the Temple of Hephaestus, Athens, Greece
