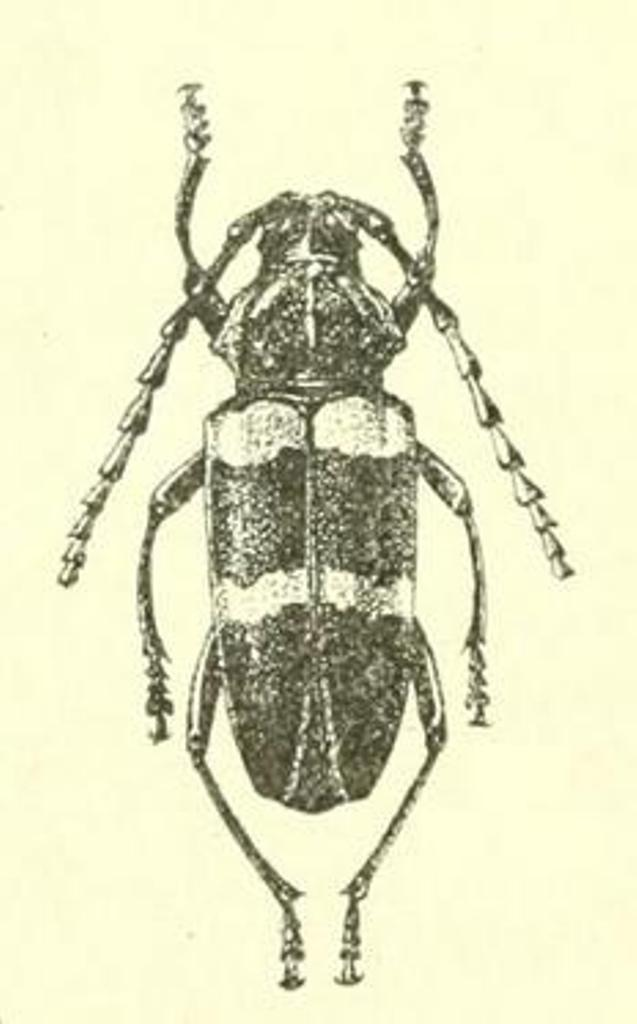
- Diastrophosternus bruchi

Scientific classification
- Domain: Eukaryota
- Kingdom: Animalia
- Phylum: Arthropoda
- Class: Insecta
- Order: Coleoptera
- Suborder: Polyphaga
- Infraorder: Cucujiformia
- Family: Cerambycidae
- Subfamily: Cerambycinae
- Tribe: Basipterini; Fragoso, Monné & Campos-Seabra, 1987

= Basipterini =

Tribe of beetles

Basipterini is a tribe of beetles in the subfamily Cerambycinae. It contains the following genera and species, found in South America:

- Genus Basiptera
  - Basiptera castaneipennis Thomson, 1864
- Genus Diastrophosternus
  - Diastrophosternus bruchi Gounelle, 1911
