= Zagymnus clerinus =

Scientific classification
- Kingdom: Animalia
- Phylum: Arthropoda
- Class: Insecta
- Order: Coleoptera
- Suborder: Polyphaga
- Infraorder: Cucujiformia
- Family: Cerambycidae
- Subfamily: Cerambycinae
- Tribe: Agallissini
- Genus: Zagymnus
- Species: Z. clerinus

Binomial name
- Zagymnus clerinus LeConte, 1873

Synonyms
- Agallissus clerinus LeConte, 1873; Agallissus floridanus Lingafelter et al., 2014; Zagymnus floridanus (Casey, 1912)

Species of beetle

Zagymnus clerinus is a species of longhorn beetle in the subfamily Cerambycinae. It was described by John Lawrence LeConte in 1873. It is known from the US states of Georgia and Florida and from Cuba.
