= Formicomimus =

Scientific classification
- Domain: Eukaryota
- Kingdom: Animalia
- Phylum: Arthropoda
- Class: Insecta
- Order: Coleoptera
- Suborder: Polyphaga
- Infraorder: Cucujiformia
- Family: Cerambycidae
- Subfamily: Cerambycinae
- Tribe: Pseudocephalini
- Genus: Formicomimus; Aurivillius, 1897
- Species: F. mirabilis

Binomial name
- Formicomimus mirabilis Aurivillius, 1897

Genus of beetles

Formicomimus is a genus of beetle in the Pseudocephalini tribe, native to Australia. It contains a single species, Formicomimus mirabilis.
