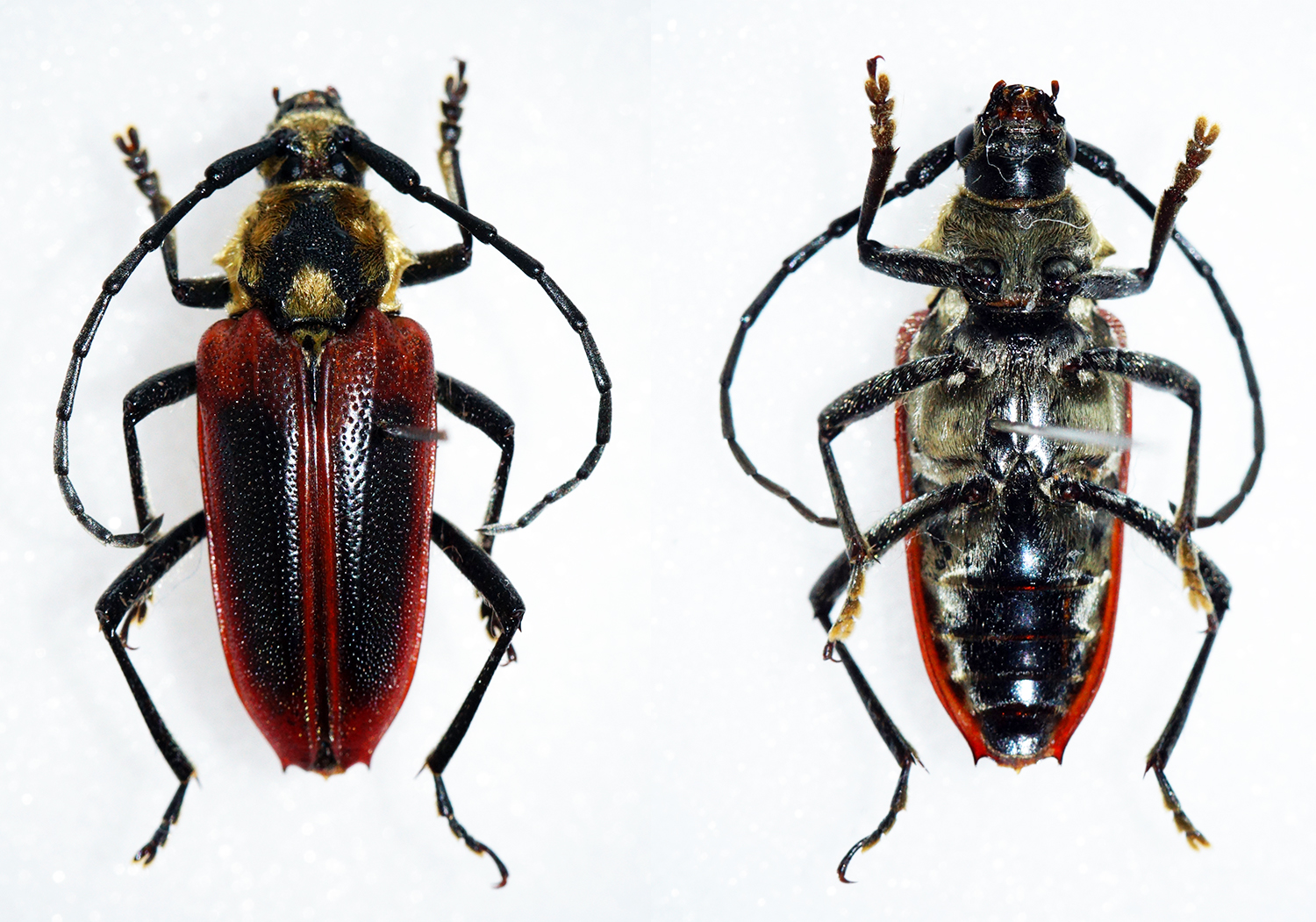

Scientific classification
- Kingdom: Animalia
- Phylum: Arthropoda
- Class: Insecta
- Order: Coleoptera
- Suborder: Polyphaga
- Infraorder: Cucujiformia
- Family: Cerambycidae
- Subfamily: Cerambycinae
- Tribe: Basipterini
- Genus: Basiptera; Thomson, 1864
- Species: B. castaneipennis

Binomial name
- Basiptera castaneipennis Thomson, 1864

Synonyms
- Anosternus Burmeister, 1879; Baseoptera Gemminger & Harold, 1873; Basiptera sanguinolentus Burmeister 1865

= Basiptera =

Species of beetle

Basiptera is a genus of Long-Horned Beetles in the beetle family Cerambycidae. This genus has a single species, Basiptera castaneipennis. It is found in Argentina, Bolivia, and Paraguay.
