= Zagymnus rugicollis =

Scientific classification
- Kingdom: Animalia
- Phylum: Arthropoda
- Class: Insecta
- Order: Coleoptera
- Suborder: Polyphaga
- Infraorder: Cucujiformia
- Family: Cerambycidae
- Subfamily: Cerambycinae
- Tribe: Agallissini
- Genus: Zagymnus
- Species: Z. rugicollis

Binomial name
- Zagymnus rugicollis Chemsak & Linsley, 1968

Species of beetle

Zagymnus rugicollis is a species of longhorn beetle in the Cerambycinae subfamily. It was described by Chemsak and Linsley in 1968. It is known from Belize.
