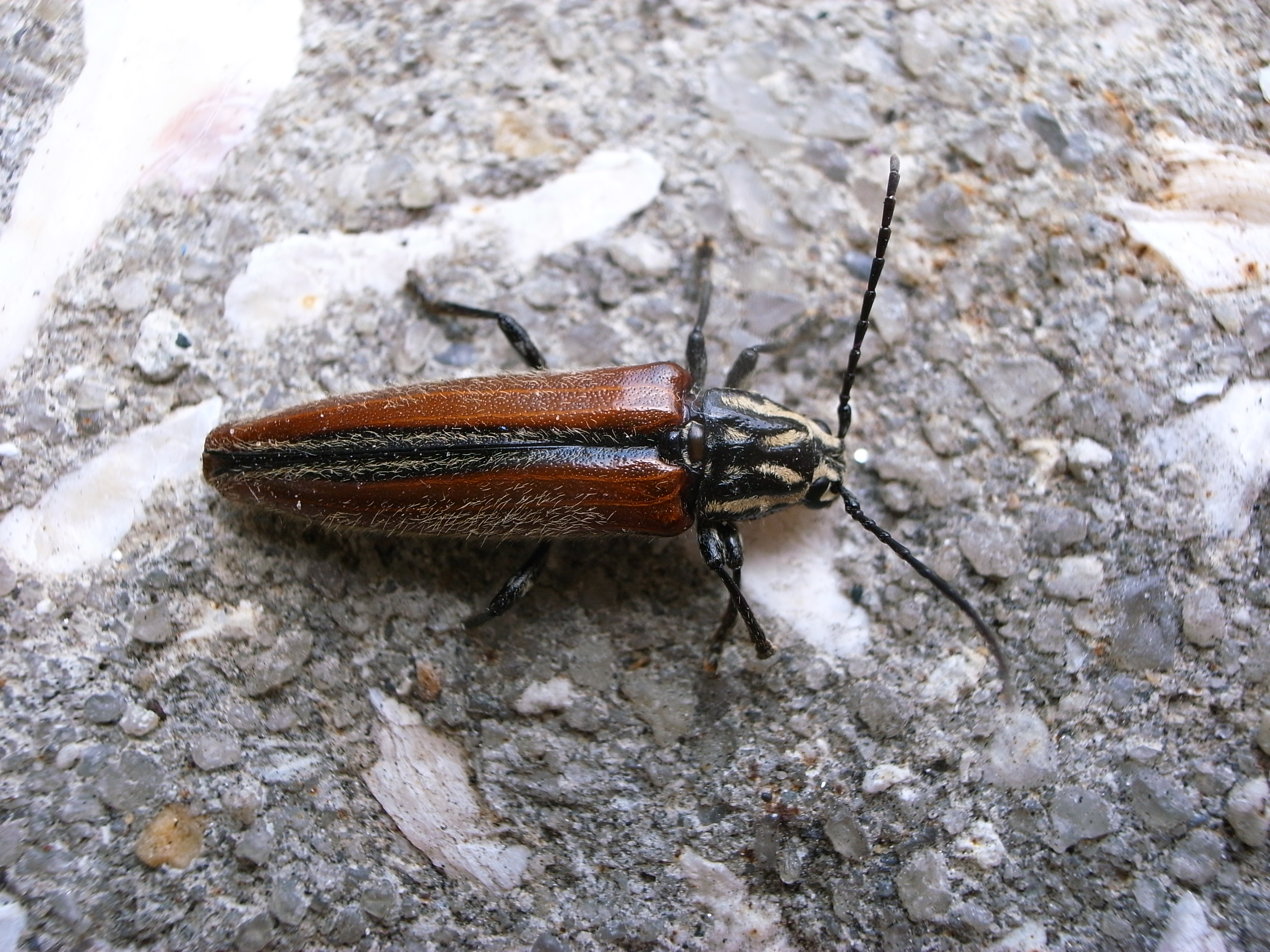

Scientific classification
- Kingdom: Animalia
- Phylum: Arthropoda
- Clade: Pancrustacea
- Class: Insecta
- Order: Coleoptera
- Suborder: Polyphaga
- Infraorder: Cucujiformia
- Family: Cerambycidae
- Subfamily: Cerambycinae
- Tribe: Agallissini
- Genus: Osmopleura
- Species: O. chamaeropis

Binomial name
- Osmopleura chamaeropis (Horn, 1893)

Synonyms
- Agalissus chamaeropis Horn, 1893; Agallissus chamaeropis Blatchley, 1928

= Osmopleura chamaeropis =

Species of beetle

Osmopleura chamaeropis is a species of longhorn beetle in the Cerambycinae subfamily, and the only species in the genus Osmopleura. It was described by George Henry Horn in 1893. It is found in Georgia and Florida, USA.
