= Diringsiella =

Scientific classification
- Kingdom: Animalia
- Phylum: Arthropoda
- Class: Insecta
- Order: Coleoptera
- Suborder: Polyphaga
- Infraorder: Cucujiformia
- Family: Cerambycidae
- Subfamily: Cerambycinae
- Tribe: Dodecosini
- Genus: Diringsiella; Martins & Galileo, 1991
- Species: D. femoralis

Binomial name
- Diringsiella femoralis Martins & Galileo, 1991

Genus of beetles

Diringsiella femoralis is a species of beetle in the family Cerambycidae. It was described by Martins and Galileo in 1991. It is the only species in the genus Diringsiella.
