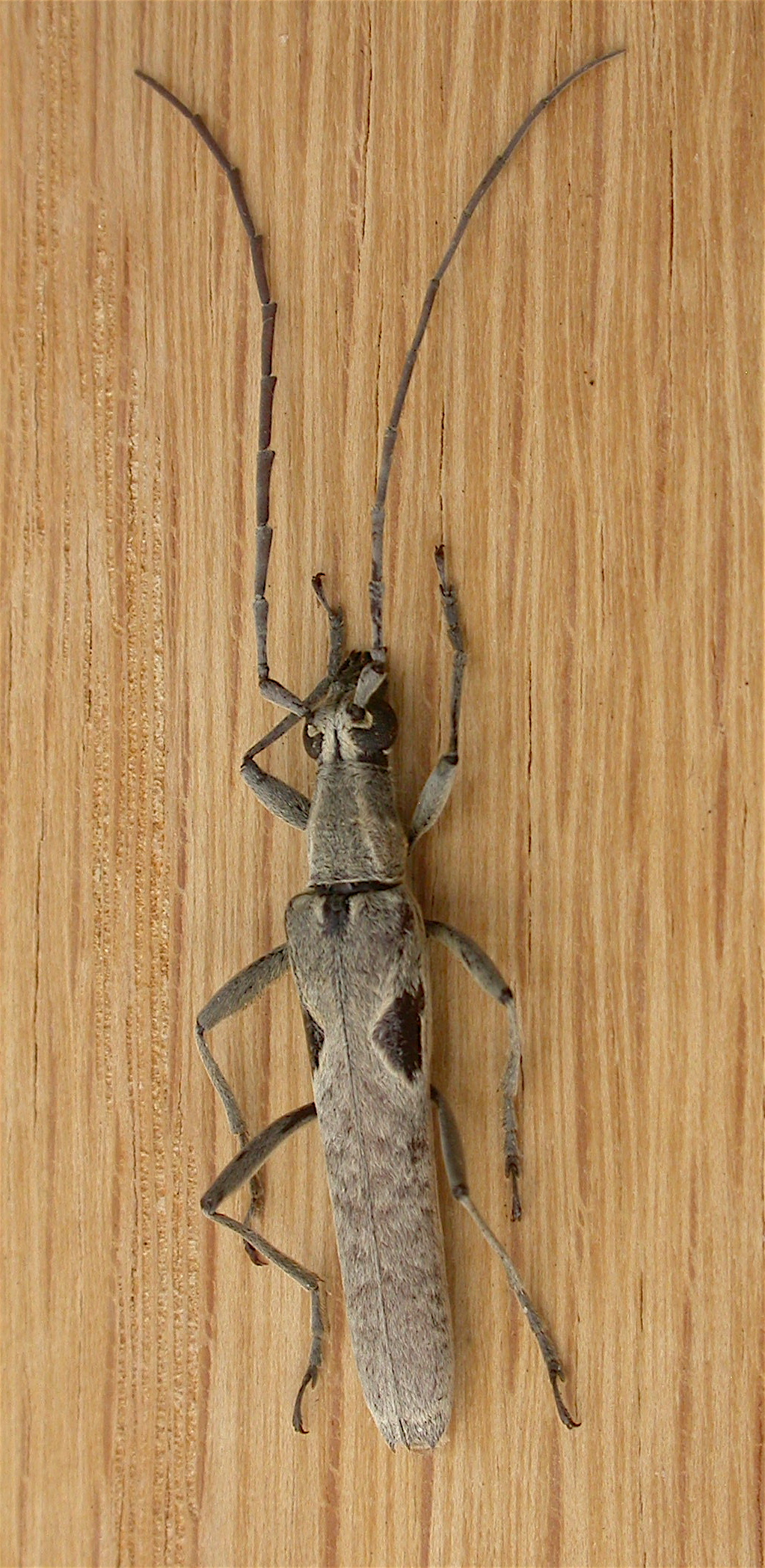
- Uracanthus triangularis

Scientific classification
- Domain: Eukaryota
- Kingdom: Animalia
- Phylum: Arthropoda
- Class: Insecta
- Order: Coleoptera
- Suborder: Polyphaga
- Infraorder: Cucujiformia
- Family: Cerambycidae
- Subfamily: Cerambycinae
- Tribe: Uracanthini
- Genus: Uracanthus; Hope, 1833

Synonyms
- Uracantha Hope, 1833

= Uracanthus =

Genus of beetles

Uracanthus is a genus of beetles in the subfamily Cerambycinae, containing over 40 described species.

== Species ==
- Uracanthus acutus Blackburn, 1889
- Uracanthus albatus Lea, 1916
- Uracanthus albopleuron Gressitt, 1959
- Uracanthus arfakianus Chemin & Vitali, 2015
- Uracanthus ater Lea, 1917
- Uracanthus bicoloratus Thongphak & Wang, 2007
- Uracanthus bistriolatus Thongphak & Wang, 2007
- Uracanthus bivitta Newman, 1838
- Uracanthus corrugicollis Lea, 1917
- Uracanthus cryptophagus Olliff, 1892
- Uracanthus cupressianus Rondonuwu & Austin, 1988
- Uracanthus declivis Gressitt, 1951
- Uracanthus discicollis Lea, 1916
- Uracanthus dubius Lea, 1916
- Uracanthus froggatti Blackburn, 1894
- Uracanthus fuscocinereus White, 1855
- Uracanthus fuscus Lea, 1916
- Uracanthus gigas Lea, 1916
- Uracanthus glabrilineatus Lea, 1917
- Uracanthus griseus Thongphak & Wang, 2007
- Uracanthus inermis Aurivillius, 1917
- Uracanthus insignis Lea, 1916
- Uracanthus lateroalbus Lea, 1916
- Uracanthus longicornis Lea, 1916
- Uracanthus loranthi Lea, 1916
- Uracanthus maculatus Thongphak & Wang, 2007
- Uracanthus maleficus Lea, 1917
- Uracanthus miniatus Pascoe, 1867
- Uracanthus pallens Hope, 1841
- Uracanthus parallelus Lea, 1916
- Uracanthus parvus Lea, 1916
- Uracanthus pertenuis Lea, 1916
- Uracanthus perthensis Thongphak & Wang, 2007
- Uracanthus pseudogigas Thongphak & Wang, 2007
- Uracanthus punctulatus Thongphak & Wang, 2007
- Uracanthus quadristriolatus Thongphak & Wang, 2007
- Uracanthus regalis McKeown, 1948
- Uracanthus simulans Pascoe, 1867
- Uracanthus strigosus Pascoe, 1875
- Uracanthus stueberi Gressitt, 1959
- Uracanthus suturalis Lea, 1916
- Uracanthus triangularis Hope, 1833
- Uracanthus tropicus Lea, 1916
- Uracanthus ventralis Lea, 1917
