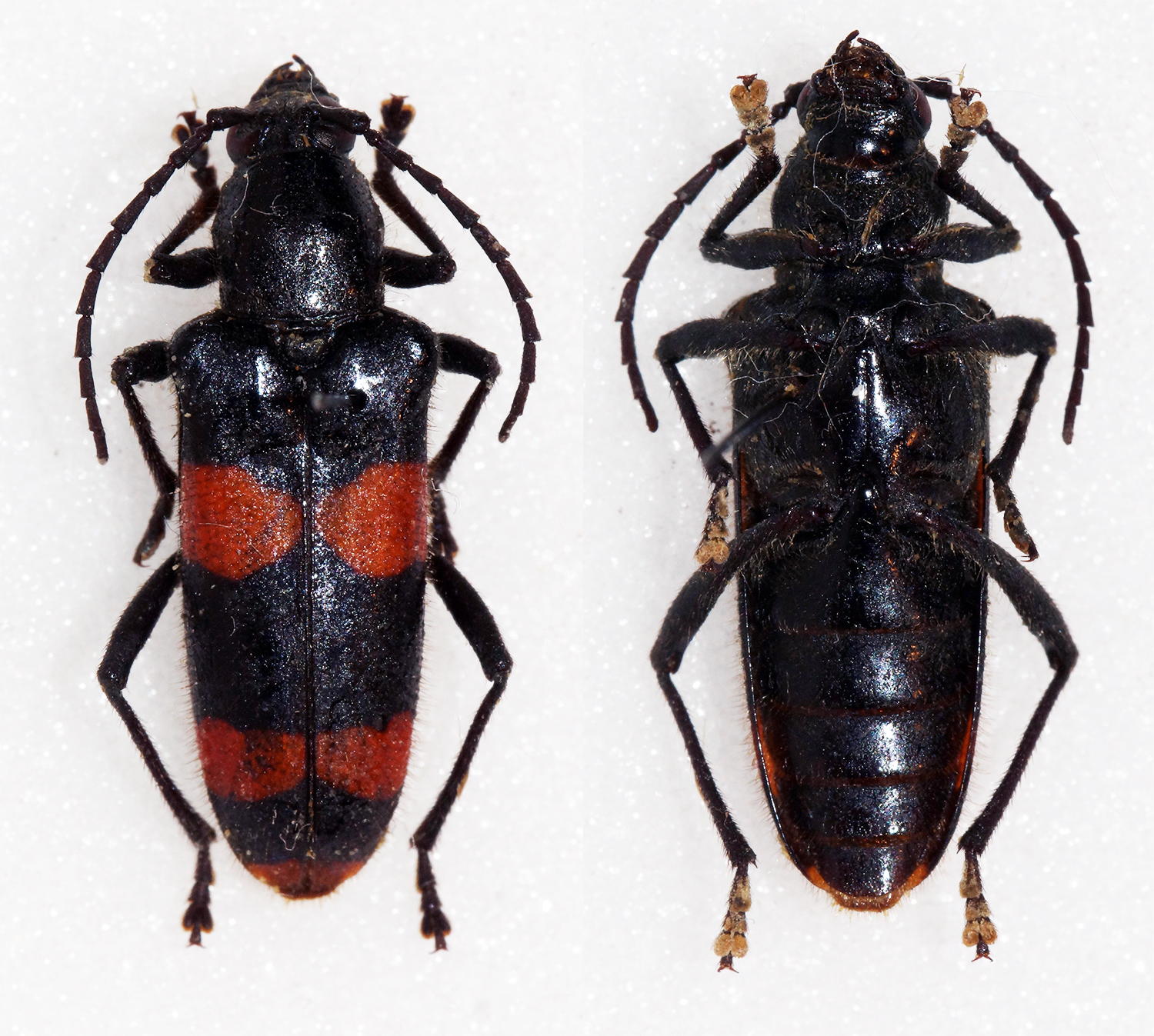
- Agallissus melaniodes

Scientific classification
- Kingdom: Animalia
- Phylum: Arthropoda
- Class: Insecta
- Order: Coleoptera
- Suborder: Polyphaga
- Infraorder: Cucujiformia
- Family: Cerambycidae
- Subfamily: Cerambycinae
- Tribe: Agallissini
- Genus: Agallissus
- Species: A. melaniodes

Binomial name
- Agallissus melaniodes Dalman, 1823

Synonyms
- Agalissus melaniodes Thomson, 1864; Agalissus melanioides Napp, 1994; Agallissus 4-maculatus Lacordaire, 1869; Agallissus melaniodes concolor Blackwelder, 1946; Agallissus melaniodes quadrimaculatus Blackwelder, 1946; Agallissus melaniodes trifasciatus Blackwelder, 1946; Agallissus melanioides Aurivillius, 1912; Agallissus melanioides concolor Aurivillius, 1912; Agallissus melanioides quadrimaculatus Aurivillius, 1912; Agallissus melanioides trifasciatus Aurivillius, 1912; Agallissus melanoides Lameere, 1883; Agallissus melanoides concolor Lameere, 1883; Agallissus melanoides trifasciatus Lameere, 1883; Agallissus quadrimaculatus White, 1853

= Agallissus melaniodes =

Species of beetle

Agallissus melaniodes is a species of longhorn beetle in the Cerambycinae subfamily. It was described by Dalman in 1823. It is known from Mexico, Honduras, and Costa Rica.
