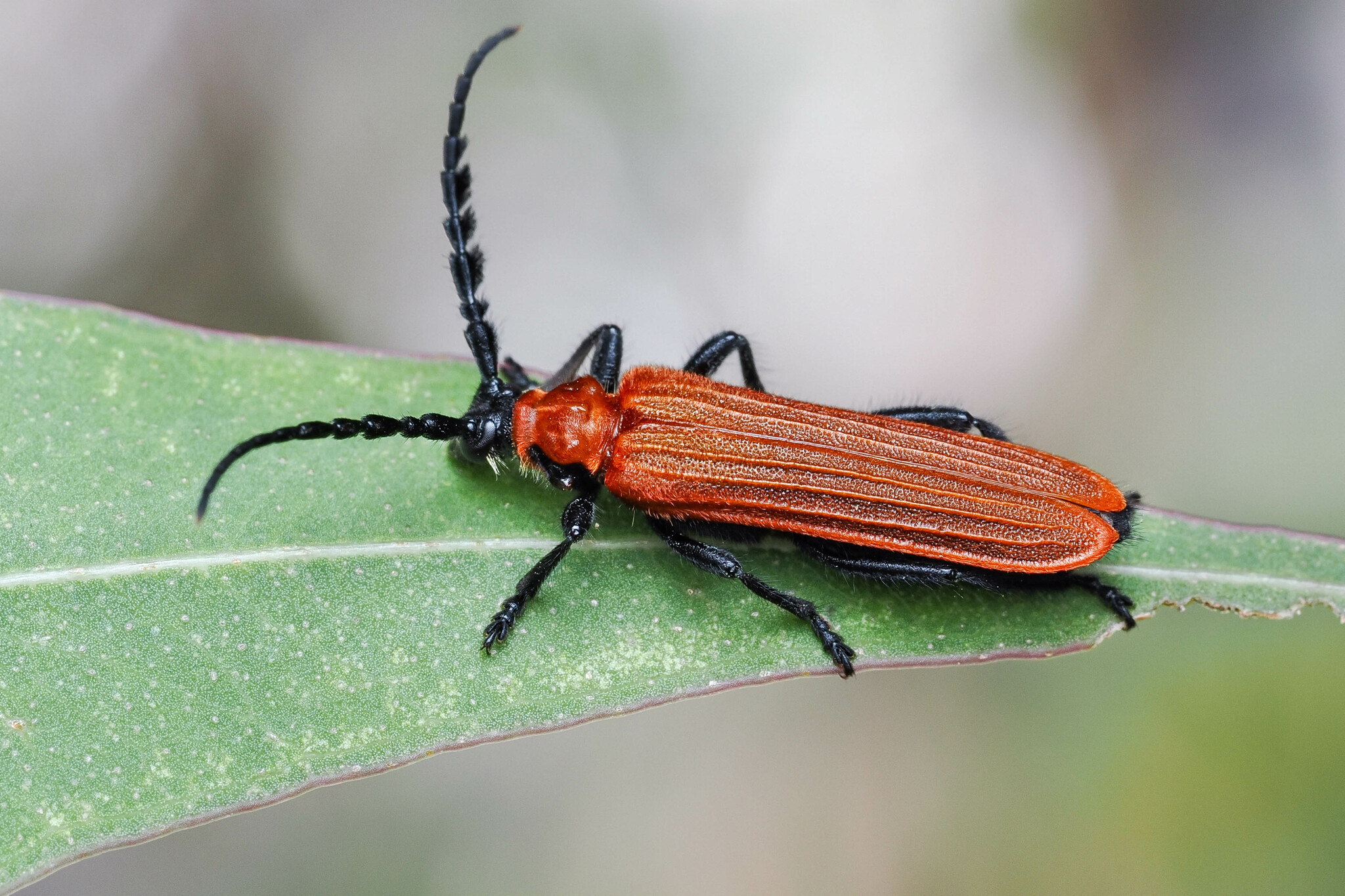

Scientific classification
- Kingdom: Animalia
- Phylum: Arthropoda
- Clade: Pancrustacea
- Class: Insecta
- Order: Coleoptera
- Suborder: Polyphaga
- Infraorder: Cucujiformia
- Family: Cerambycidae
- Subfamily: Cerambycinae
- Tribe: Eroschematini; Lacordaire, 1869

Synonyms
- Eroschemini Lacordaire, 1869

= Eroschematini =

Tribe of beetles

Eroschematini is a tribe of beetles in the subfamily Cerambycinae.

== Genera ==
- Chaodalis Pascoe, 1865
- Eroschema Pascoe, 1859
- Tethlimmena Bates, 1872

== Selected species ==
- Tethlimmena aliena Bates, 1872
- Tethlimmena basalis Gahan, 1895
- Tethlimmena gahani Gounelle, 1911
