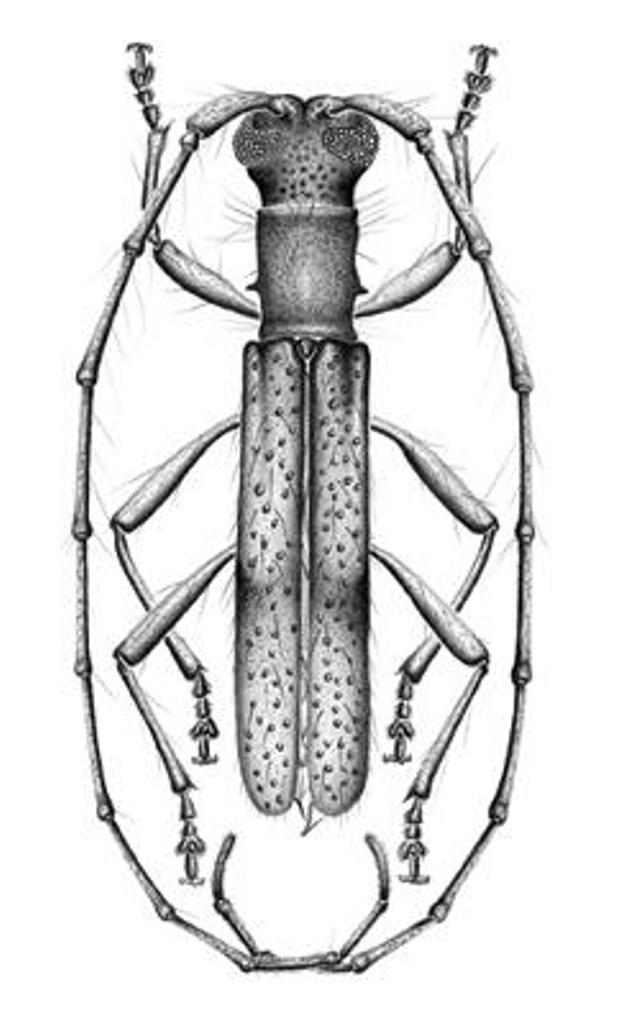
- Acangassu diminuta

Scientific classification
- Kingdom: Animalia
- Phylum: Arthropoda
- Clade: Pancrustacea
- Class: Insecta
- Order: Coleoptera
- Suborder: Polyphaga
- Infraorder: Cucujiformia
- Family: Cerambycidae
- Subfamily: Cerambycinae
- Tribe: Acangassuini; Galileo & Martins, 2001

= Acangassuini =

Tribe of longhorn beetles

Acangassuini is a tribe in the longhorn beetle that belongs to the subfamily Cerambycinae. Members of this tribe are found in Brazil.

== Taxonomy ==
There are currently two genera within Acangassuini, each with a single species. The genera are listed below:

- Acangarana Nascimento & Bravo, 2018
- Acangassu Galileo & Martins, 2001
