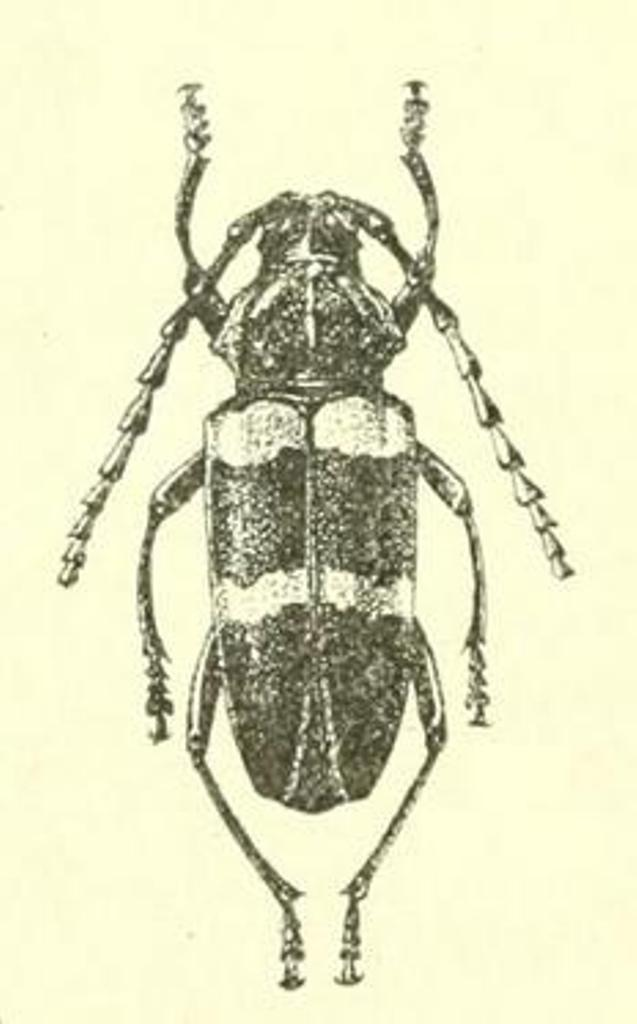

Scientific classification
- Kingdom: Animalia
- Phylum: Arthropoda
- Class: Insecta
- Order: Coleoptera
- Suborder: Polyphaga
- Infraorder: Cucujiformia
- Family: Cerambycidae
- Genus: Diastrophosternus
- Species: D. bruchi

Binomial name
- Diastrophosternus bruchi Gounelle, 1911

= Diastrophosternus =

Species of beetle

Diastrophosternus bruchi is a species of longhorn beetle in the Cerambycinae subfamily, and the only species in the genus Diastrophosternus. It was described by Gounelle in 1911. It is known from Paraguay and northern Argentina.
