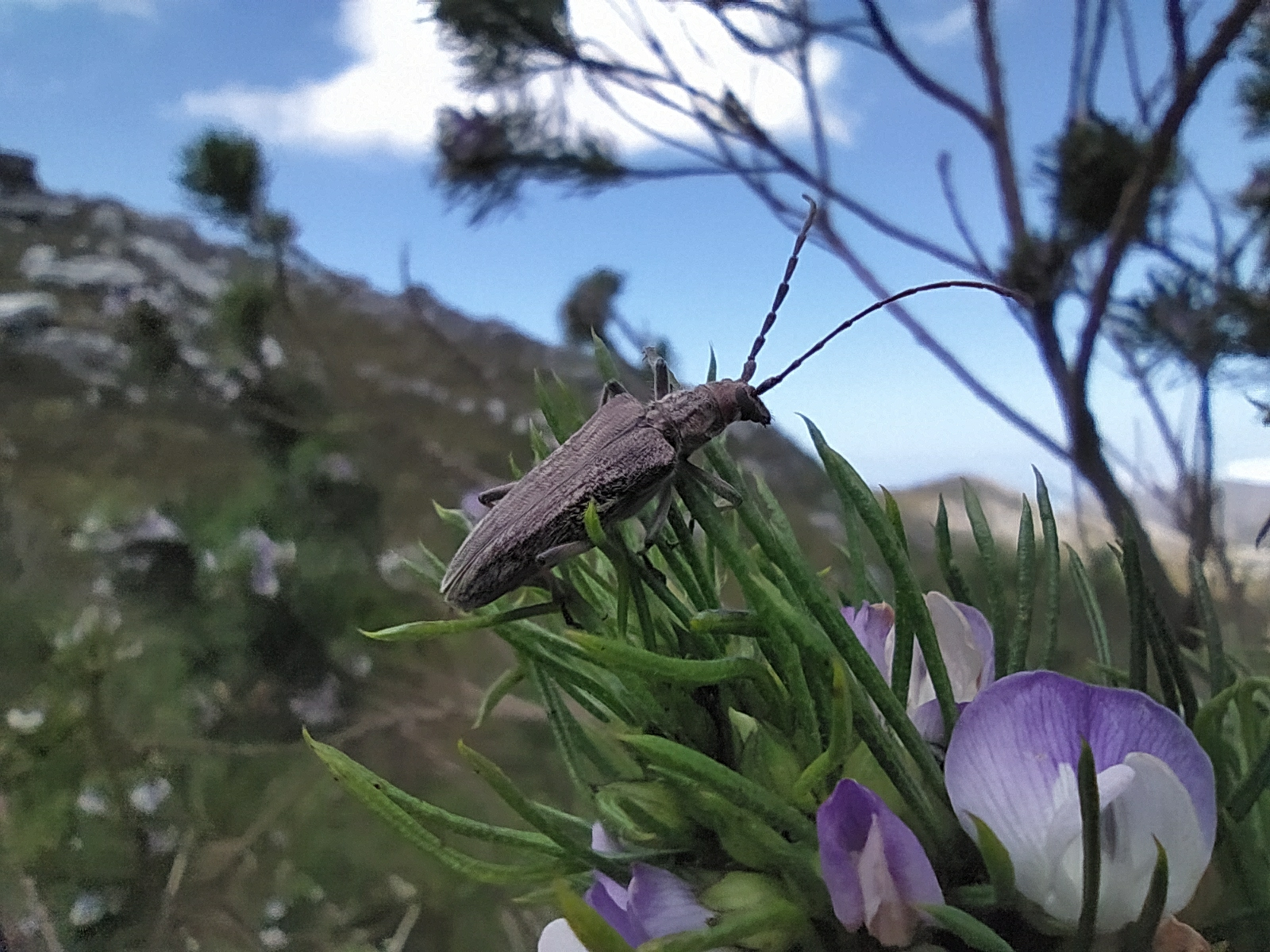
- Aristogitus cylindricus, South Africa

Scientific classification
- Kingdom: Animalia
- Phylum: Arthropoda
- Class: Insecta
- Order: Coleoptera
- Suborder: Polyphaga
- Infraorder: Cucujiformia
- Family: Cerambycidae
- Subfamily: Cerambycinae
- Tribe: Aphanasiini

= Aphanasiini =

Tribe of beetles

Aphanasiini is a tribe of Long-Horned Beetles in the beetle family Cerambycidae. There are about five genera and nine described species in Aphanasiini, found in Australia and Africa.

== Genera ==
These five genera belong to the tribe Aphanasiini:

Genus Aphanasium Dejean, 1835

Aphanasium albopilosum Lea, 1917 (Australia)
Aphanasium australe (Boisduval, 1835) (Australia)
Aphanasium flexilis (Pascoe, 1871) (Australia)
Aphanasium variegatum Blackburn, 1893 (Australia)

Genus Aphanosperma Britton, 1969

Aphanosperma occidentalis Britton, 1969 (Australia)
Aphanosperma orientalis Britton, 1969 (Australia)

Genus Aristogitus Thomson, 1864

Aristogitus cylindricus (Thomson, 1861) (South Africa)

Genus Myrsellus McKeown, 1945

Myrsellus unicolor (Hope, 1841) (Australia)

Genus Myrsinus Gahan, 1904

Myrsinus modestus Gahan, 1904 (Mozambique, Zimbabwe, South Africa, Namibia)
