= Platyarthron villiersi =

Scientific classification
- Kingdom: Animalia
- Phylum: Arthropoda
- Class: Insecta
- Order: Coleoptera
- Suborder: Polyphaga
- Infraorder: Cucujiformia
- Family: Cerambycidae
- Genus: Platyarthron
- Species: P. villiersi

Binomial name
- Platyarthron villiersi Delfino, 1985

Species of beetle

Platyarthron villiersi is a species of beetle in the family Cerambycidae. It was described by Delfino in 1985.
