= Thyrsia =

Scientific classification
- Domain: Eukaryota
- Kingdom: Animalia
- Phylum: Arthropoda
- Class: Insecta
- Order: Coleoptera
- Suborder: Polyphaga
- Infraorder: Cucujiformia
- Family: Cerambycidae
- Subfamily: Cerambycinae
- Tribe: Thyrsiini; Marinoni & Napp, 1984
- Genus: Thyrsia; Dalman, 1819

Genus of beetles

Thyrsiini is a tribe of beetles in the subfamily Cerambycinae, containing the single genus Thyrsia and the following species:

- Thyrsia lateralis Dalman, 1819
- Thyrsia piranga Galileo & Martins, 2006
