= Rhathymoscelis monnei =

Scientific classification
- Kingdom: Animalia
- Phylum: Arthropoda
- Clade: Pancrustacea
- Class: Insecta
- Order: Coleoptera
- Suborder: Polyphaga
- Infraorder: Cucujiformia
- Family: Cerambycidae
- Genus: Rhathymoscelis
- Species: R. monnei

Binomial name
- Rhathymoscelis monnei Vlasak & Santos-Silva, 2026

Species of beetle

Rhathymoscelis monnei is a species of beetle of the family Cerambycidae. It is found in Peru.

== Description ==
Adults reach a length of about 21.1–28.95 mm (0.831–1.140 in). The head capsule, flagellomeres, mandibles, scutellum, and thorax are black and the scape is orangish brown, except for the dark-brown base and apex of the dorsal and lateral surfaces. The pedicel is blackish, except for the ventral surface, which is partially dark orangish brown. The elytra are mostly dark yellowish brown, with irregular brownish areas. The membranous wings are translucent, yellowish-brown.

== Life history ==
The very slender and elongate larvae were found to feed in living branches (typically about 2-3 cm in diameter) of an unidentified small tree with orangish-brown fine scaly bark. The larva forms a long, straight central tunnel, in parts kept empty of frass, occasionally partially girdling the branch. The pupal cell is constructed in this tunnel behind a wad of tightly-packed coarse frass, with a short tunnel toward the surface right after the wad. A thin layer of bark is left intact by the larva and is removed by the emerging adult.
