= Dodecosini =

Scientific classification
- Domain: Eukaryota
- Kingdom: Animalia
- Phylum: Arthropoda
- Class: Insecta
- Order: Coleoptera
- Suborder: Polyphaga
- Infraorder: Cucujiformia
- Family: Cerambycidae
- Subfamily: Cerambycinae
- Tribe: Dodecosini; Aurivillius, 1912

Tribe of beetles

Dodecosini is a tribe of beetles in the subfamily Cerambycinae, containing the following genera and species:

- Genus Diringsiella
  - Diringsiella femoralis Martins & Galileo, 1991
- Genus Dodecosis
  - Dodecosis nigricornis Martins & Galileo, 1991
  - Dodecosis saperdina Bates, 1867
- Genus Monneella
  - Monneella bicolor Martins, 1985
- Genus Olexandrella
  - Olexandrella frederici Dalens, Giuglaris & Tavakilian, 2010
  - Olexandrella rafaeli Galileo & Martins, 2011
  - Olexandrella serotina Zajciw, 1959
