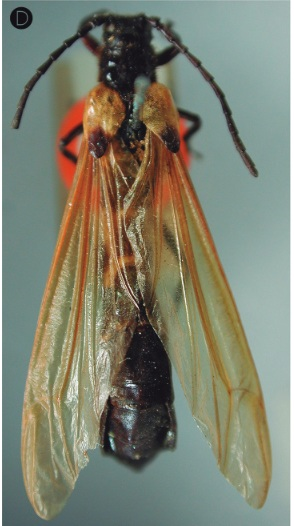

Scientific classification
- Kingdom: Animalia
- Phylum: Arthropoda
- Clade: Pancrustacea
- Class: Insecta
- Order: Coleoptera
- Suborder: Polyphaga
- Infraorder: Cucujiformia
- Family: Cerambycidae
- Genus: Rhathymoscelis
- Species: R. batesi

Binomial name
- Rhathymoscelis batesi Lane, 1965

= Rhathymoscelis batesi =

Species of beetle

Rhathymoscelis batesi is a species of beetle of the family Cerambycidae. It is found in Mexico and Guatemala.
