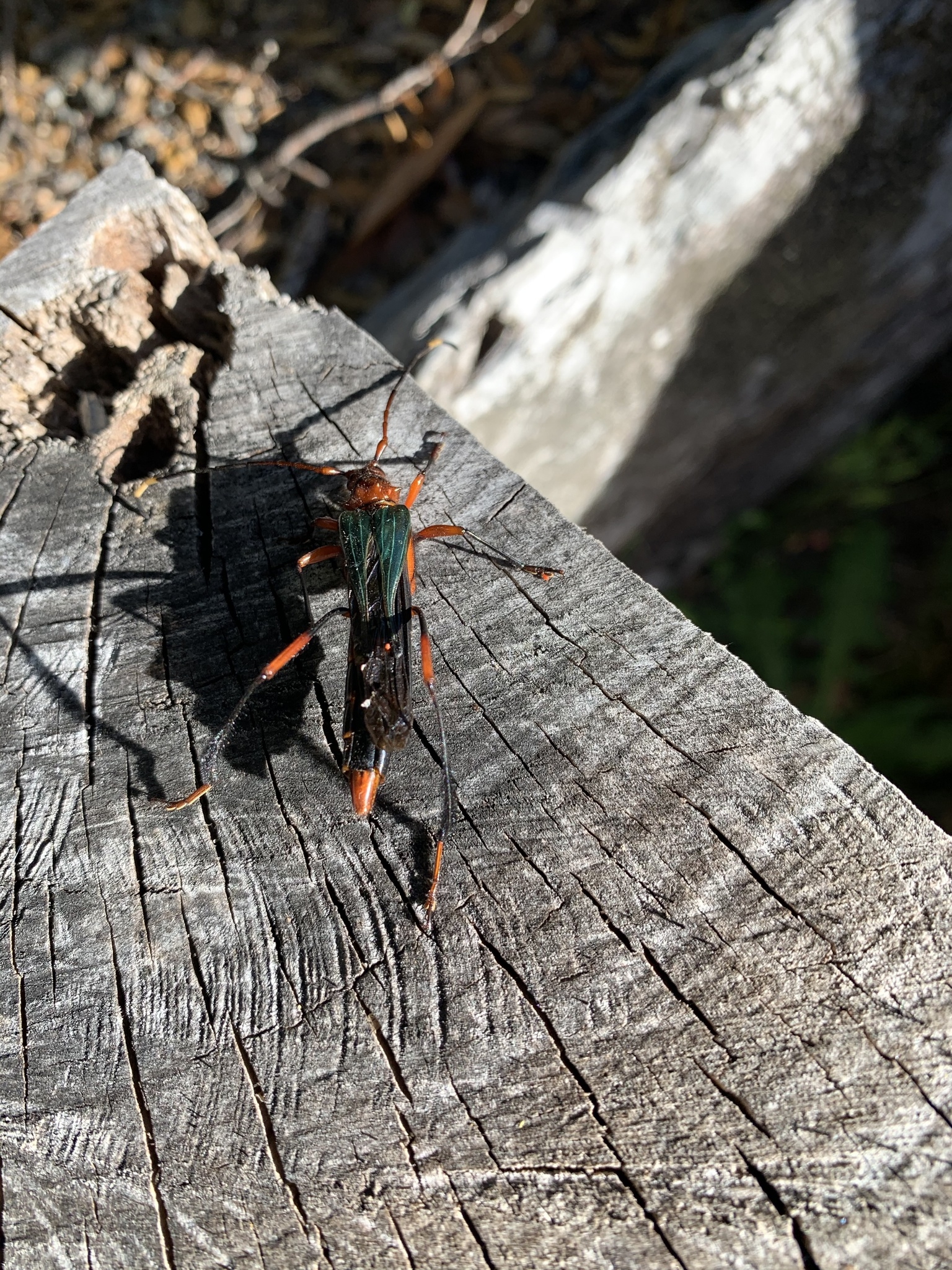
- Planopus laniniensis, Chile

Scientific classification
- Domain: Eukaryota
- Kingdom: Animalia
- Phylum: Arthropoda
- Class: Insecta
- Order: Coleoptera
- Suborder: Polyphaga
- Infraorder: Cucujiformia
- Superfamily: Chrysomeloidea
- Family: Cerambycidae
- Subfamily: Cerambycinae
- Genus: Planopus; Bosq, 1953

= Planopus =

Genus of beetles

Planopus is a genus in the longhorn beetle family Cerambycidae. There are at least two described species in Planopus.

== Species ==
These two species belong to the genus Planopus:

- Planopus laniniensis Bosq, 1953 (Argentina and Chile)
- Planopus octaviusbarrosi Cerda, 1968 (Chile)
