= Acideres =

Scientific classification
- Kingdom: Animalia
- Phylum: Arthropoda
- Clade: Pancrustacea
- Class: Insecta
- Order: Coleoptera
- Suborder: Polyphaga
- Infraorder: Cucujiformia
- Family: Cerambycidae
- Subfamily: Cerambycinae
- Genus: Acideres; Guérin-Méneville, 1858
- Species: A. ricaudii

Binomial name
- Acideres ricaudii Guérin-Méneville, 1858

Synonyms
- Phyllomorpha Montrouzier, 1861

Genus of beetles

Acideres is a genus of long-horned beetles in the family Cerambycidae. This genus has a single species, Acideres ricaudii, found in New Caledonia.

The genus Acideres was originally classified as a member of the subfamily Prioninae, but is now often treated as a member of the subfamily Cerambycinae.
