= Diorus =

Scientific classification
- Domain: Eukaryota
- Kingdom: Animalia
- Phylum: Arthropoda
- Class: Insecta
- Order: Coleoptera
- Suborder: Polyphaga
- Infraorder: Cucujiformia
- Family: Cerambycidae
- Subfamily: Cerambycinae
- Tribe: Diorini; Lane, 1950
- Genus: Diorus; White, 1853
- Species: D. biapiculatus

Binomial name
- Diorus biapiculatus White, 1853

Tribe of beetles

Diorini is a tribe of beetles in the subfamily Cerambycinae, containing the single genus Diorus and the single species Diorus biapiculatus.
