= Olexandrella frederici =

Scientific classification
- Kingdom: Animalia
- Phylum: Arthropoda
- Class: Insecta
- Order: Coleoptera
- Suborder: Polyphaga
- Infraorder: Cucujiformia
- Family: Cerambycidae
- Genus: Olexandrella
- Species: O. frederici

Binomial name
- Olexandrella frederici Dalens, Giuglaris & Tavakilian, 2010

Species of beetle

Olexandrella frederici is a species of beetle in the family Cerambycidae. It was described by Dalens, Giuglaris and Tavakilian in 2010.
