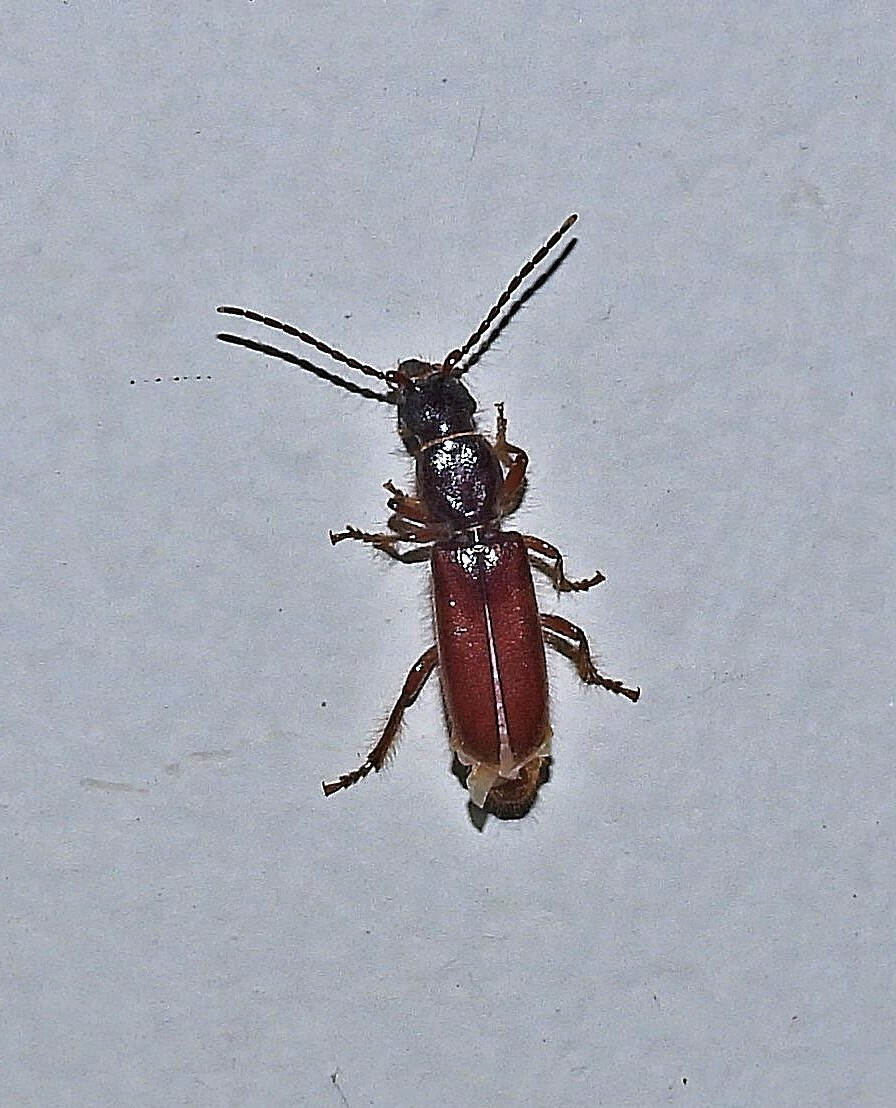

Scientific classification
- Domain: Eukaryota
- Kingdom: Animalia
- Phylum: Arthropoda
- Class: Insecta
- Order: Coleoptera
- Suborder: Polyphaga
- Infraorder: Cucujiformia
- Family: Cerambycidae
- Subfamily: Cerambycinae
- Tribe: Erlandiini; Aurivillius, 1912
- Genus: Erlandia; Aurivillius, 1904

= Erlandia =

Tribe of beetles

Erlandiini is a tribe of beetles in the subfamily Cerambycinae, containing the single genus Erlandia and the following species:

- Erlandia inopinata Aurivillius, 1904
- Erlandia mexicana Noguera & Chemsak, 2001
