= Alanizus =

Scientific classification
- Kingdom: Animalia
- Phylum: Arthropoda
- Class: Insecta
- Order: Coleoptera
- Suborder: Polyphaga
- Infraorder: Cucujiformia
- Family: Cerambycidae
- Subfamily: Cerambycinae
- Tribe: Alanizini
- Genus: Alanizus; Di Iorio, 2003
- Species: A. tortuosus

Binomial name
- Alanizus tortuosus Di Iorio, 2003

Tribe of beetles

Alanizus is a genus in the longhorn beetle family Cerambycidae, the sole genus of the tribe Alanizini. This genus has a single species, Alanizus tortuosus, found in Argentina.
