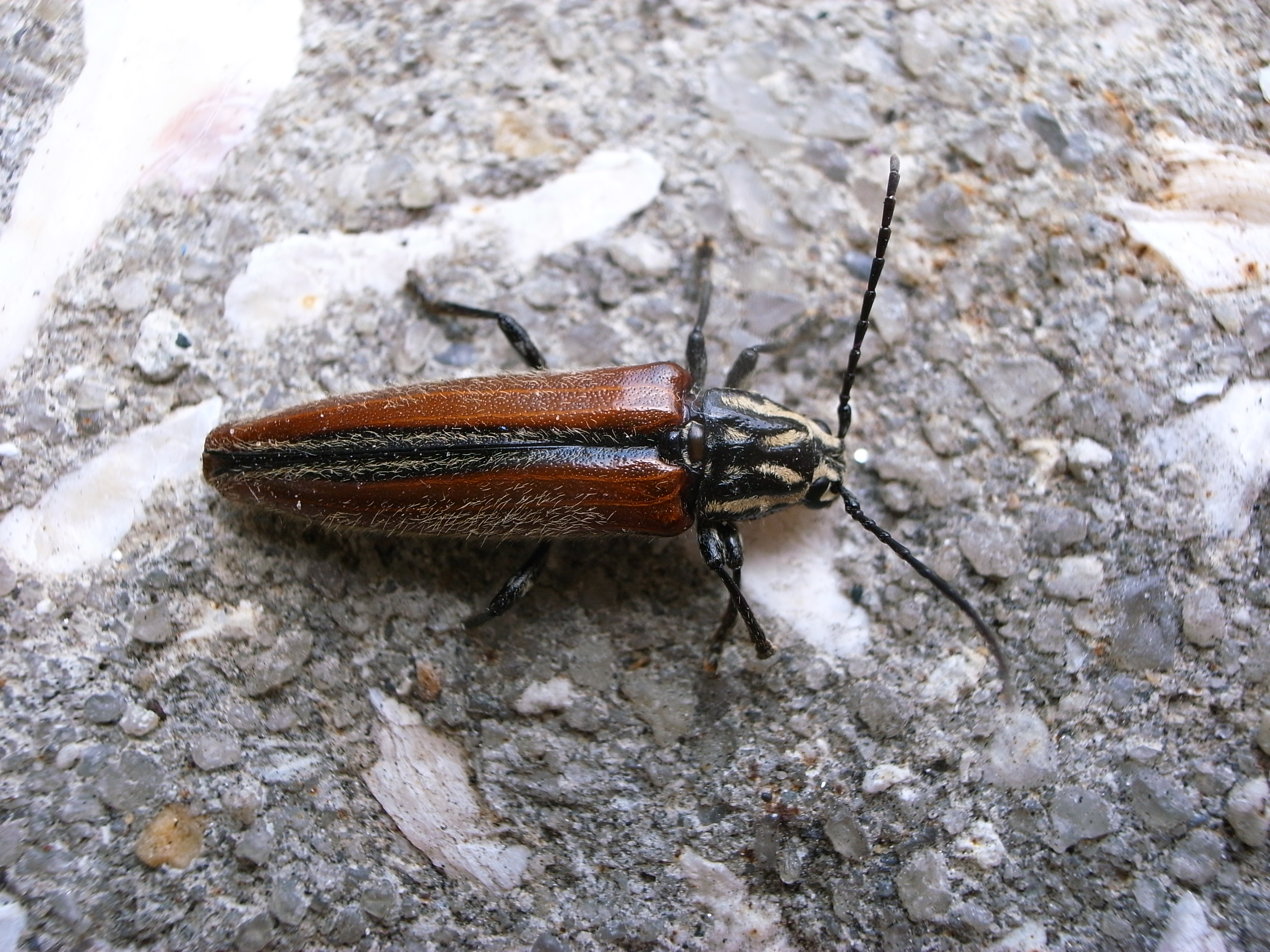
- Osmopleura chamaeropis

Scientific classification
- Kingdom: Animalia
- Phylum: Arthropoda
- Class: Insecta
- Order: Coleoptera
- Suborder: Polyphaga
- Infraorder: Cucujiformia
- Family: Cerambycidae
- Subfamily: Cerambycinae
- Tribe: Agallissini; LeConte, 1873

= Agallissini =

Tribe of beetles

Agallissini is a tribe of beetles in the subfamily Cerambycinae, containing the following genera and species:

- Genus Agallissus
  - Agallissus lepturoides (Chevrolat in Orbigny, 1844)
  - Agallissus melaniodes Dalman, 1823
- Genus Osmopleura
  - Osmopleura chamaeropis (Horn, 1893)
- Genus Zagymnus
  - Zagymnus clerinus (LeConte, 1873)
  - Zagymnus rugicollis Chemsak & Linsley, 1968
  - Zagymnus variatus Chemsak & Linsley, 1968
