= Platyarthron =

Scientific classification
- Kingdom: Animalia
- Phylum: Arthropoda
- Clade: Pancrustacea
- Class: Insecta
- Order: Coleoptera
- Suborder: Polyphaga
- Infraorder: Cucujiformia
- Family: Cerambycidae
- Subfamily: Cerambycinae
- Tribe: Platyarthrini; Bates, 1870
- Genus: Platyarthron; Guérin-Ménéville, 1844

Genus of beetles

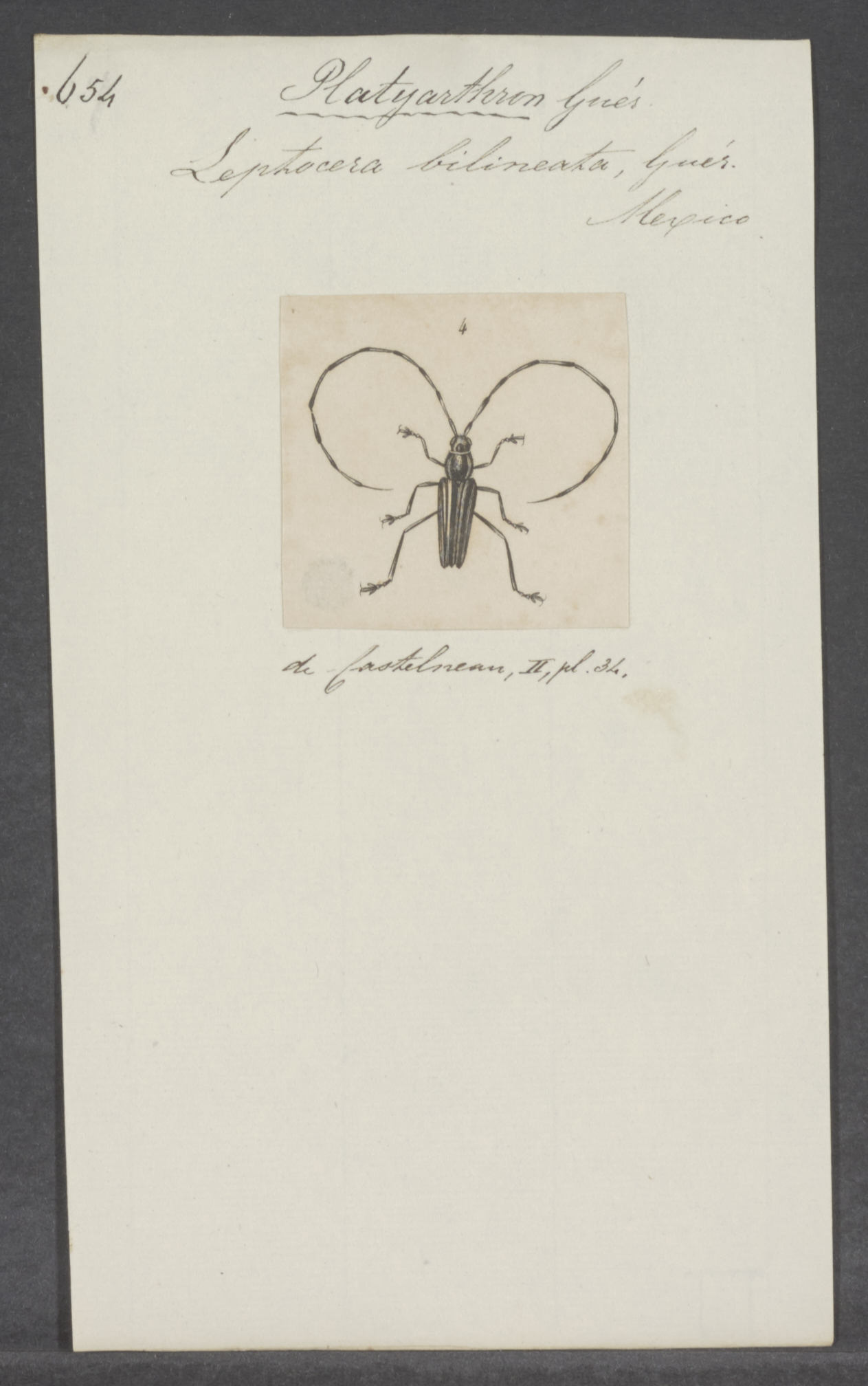
A specimen of Platyarthron from the University of Amsterdam

Platyarthron is a genus of beetles in the subfamily Cerambycinae, and the monotypic tribe Platyarthrini (a.k.a. Coelarthrini).

It contains many species including the following:

- Platyarthron bilineatum Guérin-Méneville, 1844
- Platyarthron chilense (Thomson, 1860)
- Platyarthron laterale Bates, 1885
- Platyarthron rectilineum Bates, 1880
- Platyarthron semivittatum Bates, 1885
- Platyarthron villiersi Delfino, 1985
