= Thyrsia piranga =

Scientific classification
- Domain: Eukaryota
- Kingdom: Animalia
- Phylum: Arthropoda
- Class: Insecta
- Order: Coleoptera
- Suborder: Polyphaga
- Infraorder: Cucujiformia
- Family: Cerambycidae
- Genus: Thyrsia
- Species: T. piranga

Binomial name
- Thyrsia piranga Galileo & Martins, 2006

Species of beetle

Thyrsia piranga is a species of beetle in the family Cerambycidae. It was described by Galileo and Martins in 2006.
