= Platyarthron laterale =

Scientific classification
- Kingdom: Animalia
- Phylum: Arthropoda
- Class: Insecta
- Order: Coleoptera
- Suborder: Polyphaga
- Infraorder: Cucujiformia
- Family: Cerambycidae
- Genus: Platyarthron
- Species: P. laterale

Binomial name
- Platyarthron laterale Bates, 1885

Species of beetle

Platyarthron laterale is a species of beetle in the family Cerambycidae. It was described by Bates in 1885.
