= Thyrsia lateralis =

Scientific classification
- Domain: Eukaryota
- Kingdom: Animalia
- Phylum: Arthropoda
- Class: Insecta
- Order: Coleoptera
- Suborder: Polyphaga
- Infraorder: Cucujiformia
- Family: Cerambycidae
- Genus: Thyrsia
- Species: T. lateralis

Binomial name
- Thyrsia lateralis Dalman, 1819

Species of beetle

Thyrsia lateralis is a species of beetle in the family Cerambycidae. It was described by Dalman in 1819.
