= Erlandia inopinata =

Scientific classification
- Domain: Eukaryota
- Kingdom: Animalia
- Phylum: Arthropoda
- Class: Insecta
- Order: Coleoptera
- Suborder: Polyphaga
- Infraorder: Cucujiformia
- Family: Cerambycidae
- Genus: Erlandia
- Species: E. inopinata

Binomial name
- Erlandia inopinata Aurivillius, 1904

Species of beetle

Erlandia inopinata is a species of beetle in the family Cerambycidae. It was described by Per Olof Christopher Aurivillius in 1904.
