= Dodecosis saperdina =

Scientific classification
- Kingdom: Animalia
- Phylum: Arthropoda
- Class: Insecta
- Order: Coleoptera
- Suborder: Polyphaga
- Infraorder: Cucujiformia
- Family: Cerambycidae
- Genus: Dodecosis
- Species: D. saperdina

Binomial name
- Dodecosis saperdina Bates, 1867

Species of beetle

Dodecosis saperdina is a species of beetle in the family Cerambycidae. It was described by Bates in 1867.
