= Mendesina =

- Male
- Female

Scientific classification
- Kingdom: Animalia
- Phylum: Arthropoda
- Clade: Pancrustacea
- Class: Insecta
- Order: Coleoptera
- Suborder: Polyphaga
- Infraorder: Cucujiformia
- Family: Cerambycidae
- Subfamily: Cerambycinae
- Genus: Mendesina; Lane, 1974
- Species: M. carinithorax

Binomial name
- Mendesina carinithorax (Mendes, 1938)

Synonyms
- Rhathymoscelis carinithorax Mendes, 1938

Genus of beetles

Mendesina is a genus in the longhorn beetle family Cerambycidae. This genus has a single species, Mendesina carinithorax, found in Brazil (Goiás).
