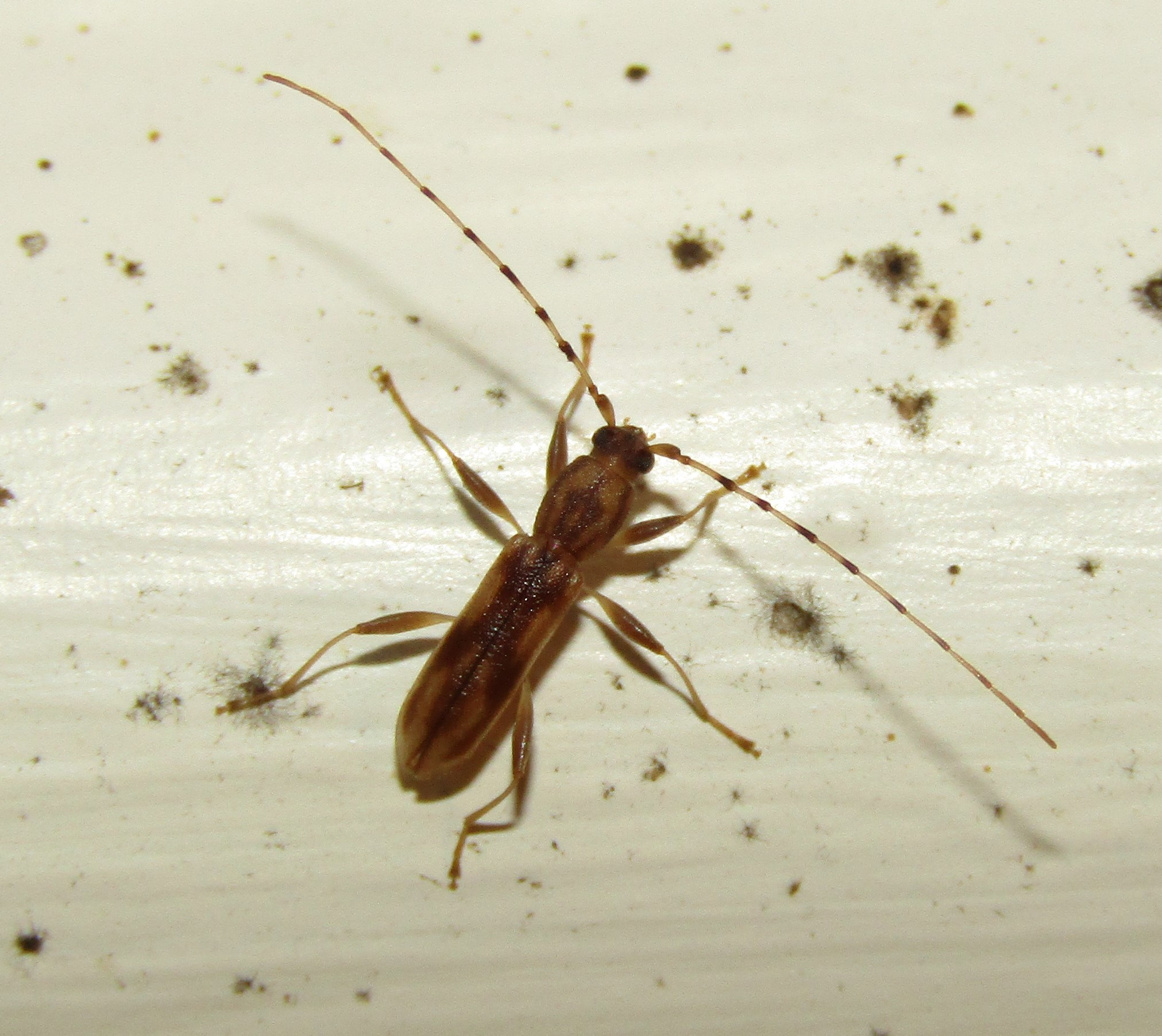

Scientific classification
- Domain: Eukaryota
- Kingdom: Animalia
- Phylum: Arthropoda
- Class: Insecta
- Order: Coleoptera
- Suborder: Polyphaga
- Infraorder: Cucujiformia
- Family: Cerambycidae
- Genus: Curius
- Species: C. dentatus

Binomial name
- Curius dentatus Newman, 1840

= Curius dentatus =

Species of beetle

Curius dentatus is a species of beetle in the family Cerambycidae. It was described by Newman in 1840.
