= Curius =

Scientific classification
- Kingdom: Animalia
- Phylum: Arthropoda
- Class: Insecta
- Order: Coleoptera
- Suborder: Polyphaga
- Infraorder: Cucujiformia
- Family: Cerambycidae
- Subfamily: Cerambycinae
- Tribe: Curiini; LeConte, 1873
- Genus: Curius; Newman, 1840

Tribe of beetles

Curius is a genus of beetles in the subfamily Cerambycinae, it is the only genus in the tribe Curiini, and contains the following species:

- Curius chemsaki Nearns & Ray, 2006
- Curius dentatus Newman, 1840
- Curius panamensis Bates, 1885
- Curius punctatus (Fisher, 1932)
