= Platyarthron chilense =

Scientific classification
- Kingdom: Animalia
- Phylum: Arthropoda
- Class: Insecta
- Order: Coleoptera
- Suborder: Polyphaga
- Infraorder: Cucujiformia
- Family: Cerambycidae
- Genus: Platyarthron
- Species: P. chilense

Binomial name
- Platyarthron chilense (Thomson, 1860)

Species of beetle

Platyarthron chilense is a species of beetle in the family Cerambycidae. It was described by Thomson in 1860.
