= Holopleura =

Scientific classification
- Kingdom: Animalia
- Phylum: Arthropoda
- Class: Insecta
- Order: Coleoptera
- Suborder: Polyphaga
- Infraorder: Cucujiformia
- Family: Cerambycidae
- Subfamily: Cerambycinae
- Tribe: Holopleurini
- Genus: Holopleura; LeConte, 1873

Genus of beetles

Holopleura is a genus of long-horned beetles in the family Cerambycidae. It is the only genus in the tribe Holopleurini. There is at least one described species in Holopleura, H. marginata.
