= Pleiarthrocerus =

Scientific classification
- Domain: Eukaryota
- Kingdom: Animalia
- Phylum: Arthropoda
- Class: Insecta
- Order: Coleoptera
- Suborder: Polyphaga
- Infraorder: Cucujiformia
- Family: Cerambycidae
- Subfamily: Cerambycinae
- Tribe: Pleiarthrocerini; Lane, 1950
- Genus: Pleiarthrocerus; Bruch, 1914
- Species: P. opacus

Binomial name
- Pleiarthrocerus opacus Bruch, 1914

Genus of beetles

Pleiarthrocerus is a genus of beetles in the subfamily Cerambycinae, containing the single species Pleiarthrocerus opacus. It is the only genus of the tribe Pleiarthrocerini.
