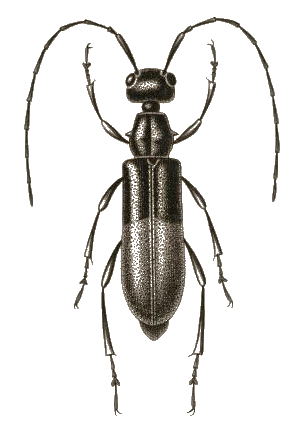
- Pseudocephalus monstrosus

Scientific classification
- Kingdom: Animalia
- Phylum: Arthropoda
- Clade: Pancrustacea
- Class: Insecta
- Order: Coleoptera
- Suborder: Polyphaga
- Infraorder: Cucujiformia
- Family: Cerambycidae
- Subfamily: Cerambycinae
- Tribe: Pseudocephalini; Aurivillius, 1912

= Pseudocephalini =

Tribe of beetles

Pseudocephalini is a tribe of beetles in the subfamily Cerambycinae. They are most commonly found in Australia.

== Genus ==
- Cyclocranium van der Poll, 1891
- Formicomimus Aurivillius, 1897
- Pseudocephalus Newman, 1842

== See also ==
- Cyclocranium swierstrae
