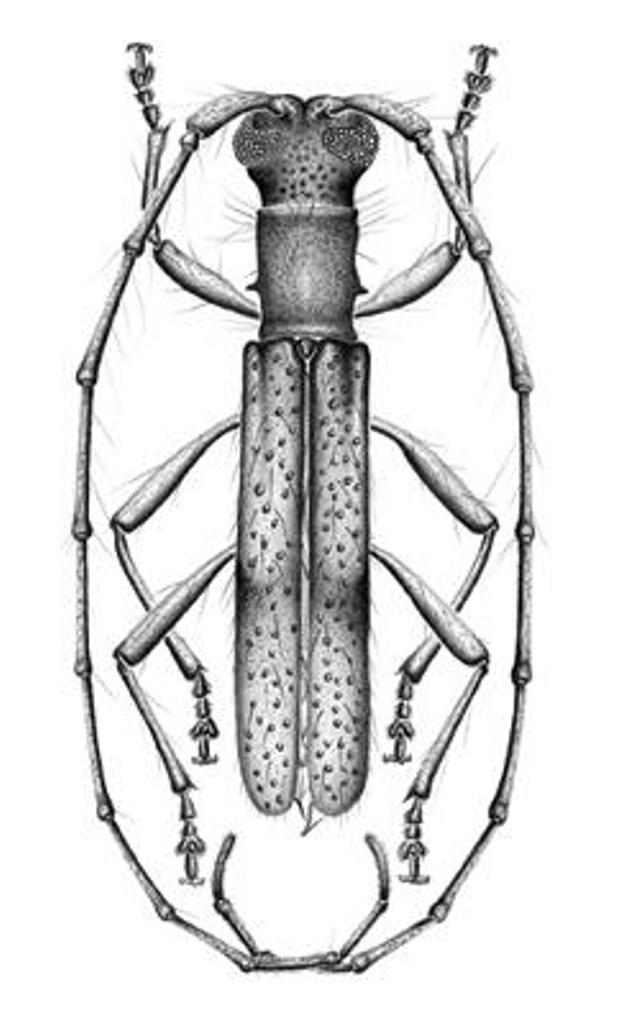

Scientific classification
- Kingdom: Animalia
- Phylum: Arthropoda
- Clade: Pancrustacea
- Class: Insecta
- Order: Coleoptera
- Suborder: Polyphaga
- Infraorder: Cucujiformia
- Family: Cerambycidae
- Subfamily: Cerambycinae
- Tribe: Ibidionini
- Genus: Acangassu; Galileo & Martins, 2001
- Species: A. diminuta

Binomial name
- Acangassu diminuta Galileo & Martins, 2001

= Acangassu =

Genus of beetles

Acangassu is a beetle genus in the Cerambycinae subfamily and the tribe Ibidionini. It was previously placed in the obsolete monotypic tribe Acangassuini Galileo & Martins, 2001. It contains a single species, Acangassu diminuta. It is widespread in southern Brazil (Rio de Janeiro).
