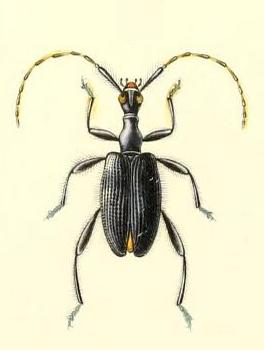
- Amphoecus metallicus

Scientific classification
- Kingdom: Animalia
- Phylum: Arthropoda
- Class: Insecta
- Order: Coleoptera
- Suborder: Polyphaga
- Infraorder: Cucujiformia
- Family: Cerambycidae
- Subfamily: Cerambycinae
- Tribe: Amphoecini; Breuning, 1951

= Amphoecini =

Tribe of beetles

Amphoecini is a tribe of beetles in the subfamily Cerambycinae, containing the following genera:

- Amphoecus Montrouzier, 1861
- Cyanamphoecus Breuning, 1951
