= Paraholopterus =

Scientific classification
- Domain: Eukaryota
- Kingdom: Animalia
- Phylum: Arthropoda
- Class: Insecta
- Order: Coleoptera
- Suborder: Polyphaga
- Infraorder: Cucujiformia
- Family: Cerambycidae
- Subfamily: Cerambycinae
- Tribe: Paraholopterini; Martins, 1997
- Genus: Paraholopterus; Cerda & Cekalovic, 1986
- Species: P. nahuelbutensis

Binomial name
- Paraholopterus nahuelbutensis Cerda & Cekalovic, 1986

Genus of beetles

Paraholopterini is a tribe of beetles in the subfamily Cerambycinae, containing the single genus Paraholopterus and the single species Paraholopterus nahuelbutensis.
