= Hephaestioides =

Scientific classification
- Kingdom: Animalia
- Phylum: Arthropoda
- Class: Insecta
- Order: Coleoptera
- Suborder: Polyphaga
- Infraorder: Cucujiformia
- Family: Cerambycidae
- Subfamily: Cerambycinae
- Genus: Hephaestioides; Zajciw, 1961
- Species: H. cyanipennis

Binomial name
- Hephaestioides cyanipennis Zajciw, 1961

Genus of beetles

Hephaestioides is a genus in the longhorn beetle family Cerambycidae. This genus has a single species, Hephaestioides cyanipennis. It is found in Brazil.
