= Curius chemsaki =

Scientific classification
- Domain: Eukaryota
- Kingdom: Animalia
- Phylum: Arthropoda
- Class: Insecta
- Order: Coleoptera
- Suborder: Polyphaga
- Infraorder: Cucujiformia
- Family: Cerambycidae
- Genus: Curius
- Species: C. chemsaki

Binomial name
- Curius chemsaki Nearns & Ray, 2006

Species of beetle

Curius chemsaki is a species of beetle in the family Cerambycidae. It was described by Nearns and Ray in 2006.
