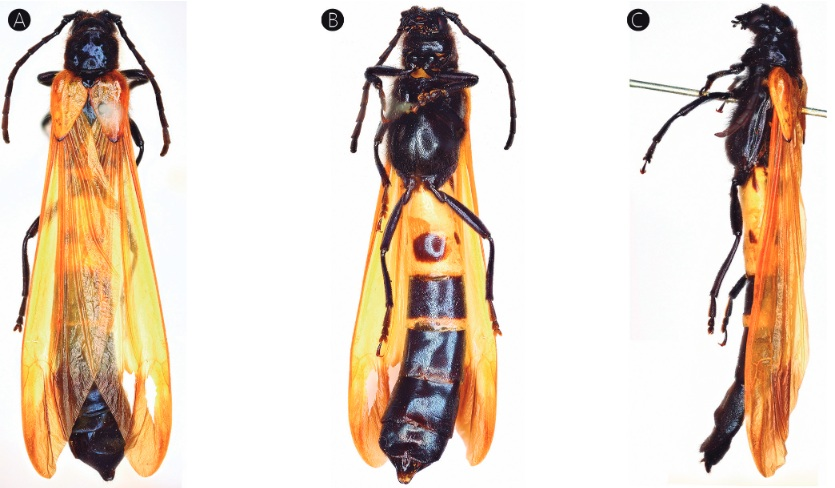

Scientific classification
- Kingdom: Animalia
- Phylum: Arthropoda
- Clade: Pancrustacea
- Class: Insecta
- Order: Coleoptera
- Suborder: Polyphaga
- Infraorder: Cucujiformia
- Family: Cerambycidae
- Genus: Rhathymoscelis
- Species: R. rothschildi

Binomial name
- Rhathymoscelis rothschildi Lane, 1965

= Rhathymoscelis rothschildi =

Species of beetle

Rhathymoscelis rothschildi is a species of beetle of the family Cerambycidae. It is found in Mexico (Oaxaca, Tlaxcala).
