= Platyarthron rectilineum =

Scientific classification
- Kingdom: Animalia
- Phylum: Arthropoda
- Class: Insecta
- Order: Coleoptera
- Suborder: Polyphaga
- Infraorder: Cucujiformia
- Family: Cerambycidae
- Genus: Platyarthron
- Species: P. rectilineum

Binomial name
- Platyarthron rectilineum Bates, 1880

Species of beetle

Platyarthron rectilineum is a species of beetle in the family Cerambycidae. It was described by Bates in 1880.
