= Parahephaestion =

Scientific classification
- Kingdom: Animalia
- Phylum: Arthropoda
- Class: Insecta
- Order: Coleoptera
- Suborder: Polyphaga
- Infraorder: Cucujiformia
- Superfamily: Chrysomeloidea
- Family: Cerambycidae
- Subfamily: Cerambycinae
- Genus: Parahephaestion; Melzer, 1930

Genus of beetles

Parahephaestion is a genus in the longhorn beetle family Cerambycidae. There are at least three described species in Parahephaestion, found in Brazil.

== Species ==
These three species belong to the genus Parahephaestion:

- Parahephaestion brasiliensis (Melzer, 1923)
- Parahephaestion malleri (Melzer, 1930)
- Parahephaestion zikani (Melzer, 1923)
