= Atelopteryx =

Scientific classification
- Domain: Eukaryota
- Kingdom: Animalia
- Phylum: Arthropoda
- Class: Insecta
- Order: Coleoptera
- Suborder: Polyphaga
- Infraorder: Cucujiformia
- Family: Cerambycidae
- Subfamily: Cerambycinae
- Genus: Atelopteryx; Lacordaire, 1869
- Species: A. compsoceroides

Binomial name
- Atelopteryx compsoceroides Lacordaire, 1869

Genus of beetles

Atelopteryx is a genus in the longhorn beetle family Cerambycidae. This genus has a single species, Atelopteryx compsoceroides. It is found in Argentina, Brazil, and Paraguay.

This species was described by Lecordaire in 1869.
