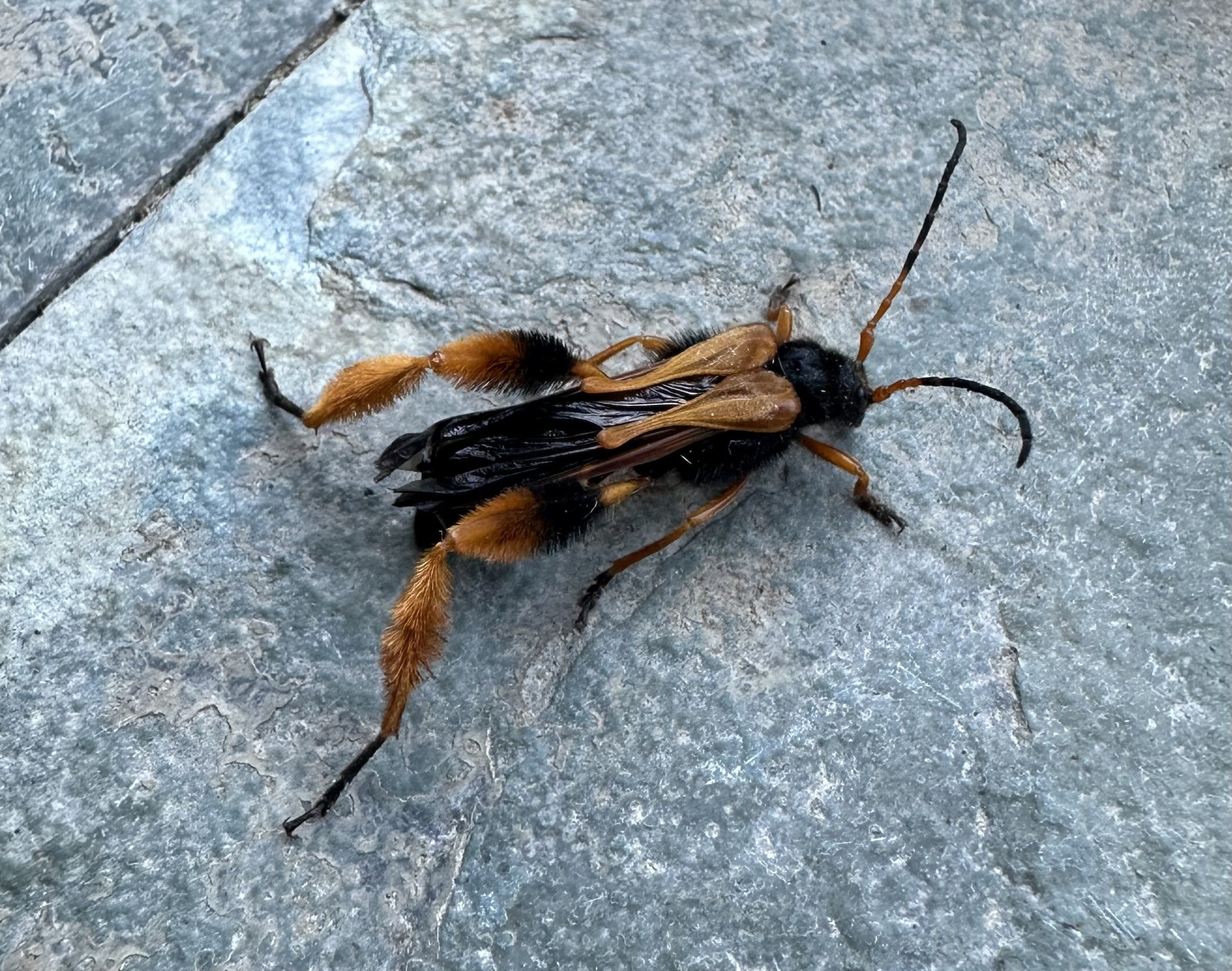
- Callisphyris macropus, Chile

Scientific classification
- Kingdom: Animalia
- Phylum: Arthropoda
- Class: Insecta
- Order: Coleoptera
- Suborder: Polyphaga
- Infraorder: Cucujiformia
- Family: Cerambycidae
- Subfamily: Cerambycinae
- Genus: Callisphyris; Newman, 1840

Synonyms
- Callisphyrus Agassiz, 1846

= Callisphyris =

Genus of beetles

Callisphyris is a genus in the longhorn beetle family Cerambycidae. There are about 10 described species in Callisphyris.

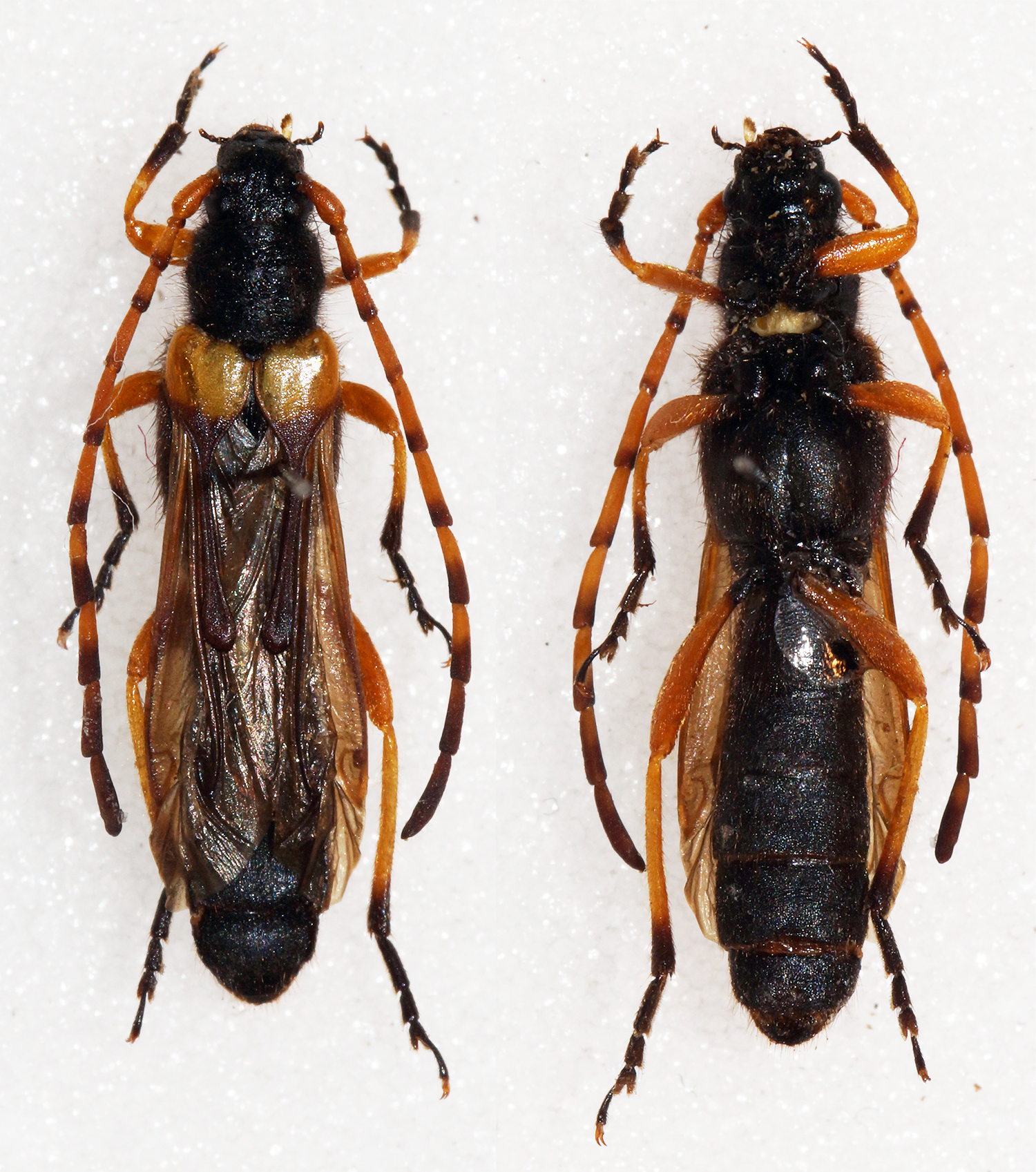
Callisphyris molorchoides

== Species ==
These 10 species belong to the genus Callisphyris:

- Callisphyris apicicornis Fairmaire & Germain, 1859 (Argentina and Chile)
- Callisphyris crassus Barriga & Peña, 1994 (Chile)
- Callisphyris ficheti Barriga & Peña, 1994 (Chile)
- Callisphyris fritzi Cerda, 1968 (Chile)
- Callisphyris leptopus R. Philippi, 1859 (Argentina and Chile)
- Callisphyris macropus Newman, 1840 (Argentina and Chile)
- Callisphyris molorchoides (Guérin-Méneville, 1839) (Argentina and Chile)
- Callisphyris odyneroides Fairmaire & Germain, 1864 (Argentina and Chile)
- Callisphyris pepsioides Barriga & Peña, 1994 (Chile)
- Callisphyris rufiventer (R. Philippi, 1859) (Chile)
