= Erlandia mexicana =

Scientific classification
- Domain: Eukaryota
- Kingdom: Animalia
- Phylum: Arthropoda
- Class: Insecta
- Order: Coleoptera
- Suborder: Polyphaga
- Infraorder: Cucujiformia
- Family: Cerambycidae
- Genus: Erlandia
- Species: E. mexicana

Binomial name
- Erlandia mexicana Noguera & Chemsak, 2001

Species of beetle

Erlandia mexicana is a species of beetle in the family Cerambycidae. It was described by Noguera and Chemsak in 2001.
