= Eumichthus =

Scientific classification
- Kingdom: Animalia
- Phylum: Arthropoda
- Class: Insecta
- Order: Coleoptera
- Suborder: Polyphaga
- Infraorder: Cucujiformia
- Family: Cerambycidae
- Subfamily: Cerambycinae
- Genus: Eumichthus; LeConte, 1873
- Species: E. oedipus

Binomial name
- Eumichthus oedipus LeConte, 1873

Genus of beetles

Eumichthus is a monotypic genus in the family Cerambycidae described by John Lawrence LeConte in 1873. Its only species, Eumichthus oedipus, described by the same author in the same year, is found in western North America.
