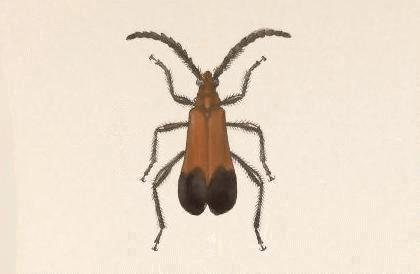

Scientific classification
- Kingdom: Animalia
- Phylum: Arthropoda
- Class: Insecta
- Order: Coleoptera
- Suborder: Polyphaga
- Infraorder: Cucujiformia
- Family: Cerambycidae
- Genus: Tethlimmena
- Species: T. aliena

Binomial name
- Tethlimmena aliena Bates, 1872

= Tethlimmena aliena =

Species of beetle

Tethlimmena aliena is a species of beetle in the family Cerambycidae. It was described by Bates in 1872.
