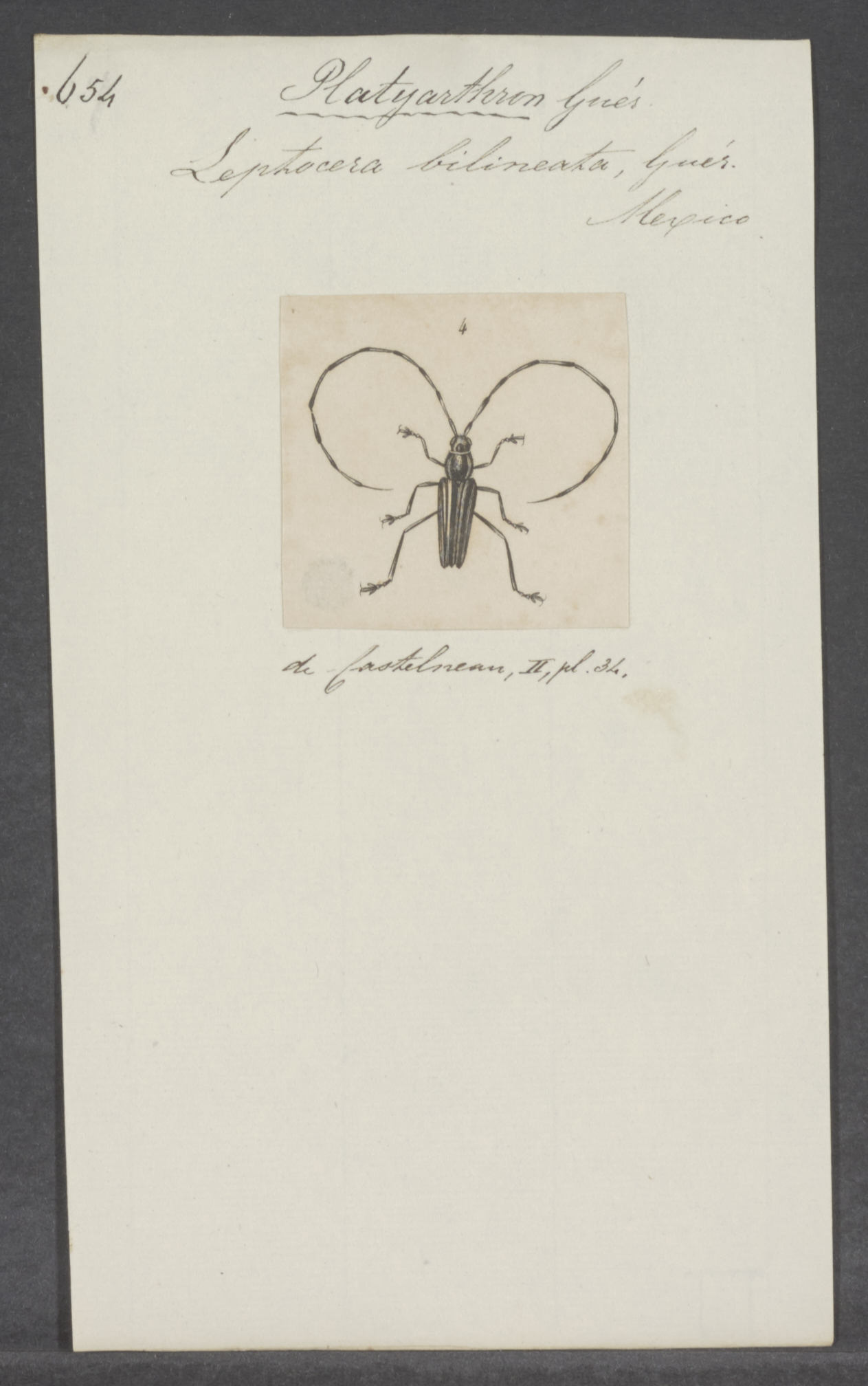

Scientific classification
- Kingdom: Animalia
- Phylum: Arthropoda
- Clade: Pancrustacea
- Class: Insecta
- Order: Coleoptera
- Suborder: Polyphaga
- Infraorder: Cucujiformia
- Family: Cerambycidae
- Genus: Platyarthron
- Species: P. bilineatum

Binomial name
- Platyarthron bilineatum Guérin-Méneville, 1844

= Platyarthron bilineatum =

Species of beetle

Platyarthron bilineatum is a species of beetle in the family Cerambycidae. It was described by Félix Édouard Guérin-Méneville in 1844.
