= Poecilobrium =

Scientific classification
- Kingdom: Animalia
- Phylum: Arthropoda
- Class: Insecta
- Order: Coleoptera
- Suborder: Polyphaga
- Infraorder: Cucujiformia
- Family: Cerambycidae
- Subfamily: Cerambycinae
- Genus: Poecilobrium; Horn, 1883
- Species: P. chalybeum

Binomial name
- Poecilobrium chalybeum (LeConte, 1873)

Genus of beetles

Poecilobrium is a monotypic beetle genus in the family Cerambycidae first described by Horn in 1883. Its single species, Poecilobrium chalybeum, was described by John Lawrence LeConte in 1873.
