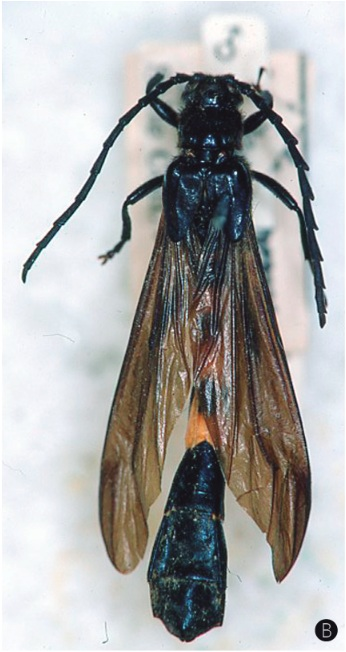

Scientific classification
- Kingdom: Animalia
- Phylum: Arthropoda
- Clade: Pancrustacea
- Class: Insecta
- Order: Coleoptera
- Suborder: Polyphaga
- Infraorder: Cucujiformia
- Family: Cerambycidae
- Genus: Rhathymoscelis
- Species: R. haldemanii

Binomial name
- Rhathymoscelis haldemanii Thomson, 1861

= Rhathymoscelis haldemanii =

Species of beetle

Rhathymoscelis haldemanii is a species of beetle of the family Cerambycidae. It is found in Mexico (Veracruz and Guerrero). Records from Guatemala are based on misidentifications.
