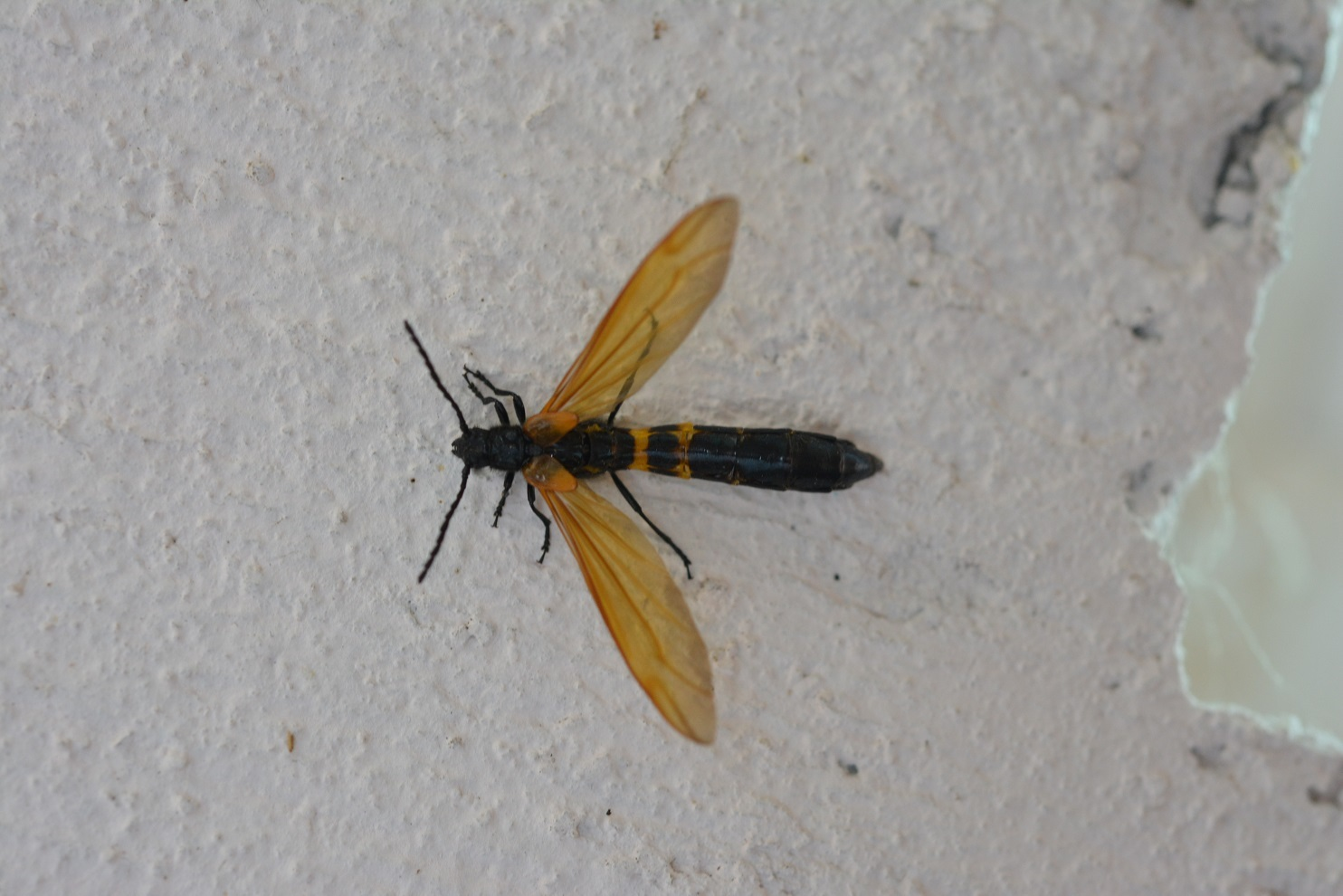
- Rhathymoscelis batesi, México

Scientific classification
- Kingdom: Animalia
- Phylum: Arthropoda
- Clade: Pancrustacea
- Class: Insecta
- Order: Coleoptera
- Suborder: Polyphaga
- Infraorder: Cucujiformia
- Superfamily: Chrysomeloidea
- Family: Cerambycidae
- Subfamily: Cerambycinae
- Genus: Rhathymoscelis; Thomson, 1861

= Rhathymoscelis =

Genus of beetles

Rhathymoscelis is a genus in the longhorn beetle family Cerambycidae. There are about 10 described species in Rhathymoscelis, found in Mexico, Central America, and South America.

== Species ==
These 10 species belong to the genus Rhathymoscelis:

- Rhathymoscelis batesi Lane, 1965 (Mexico)
- Rhathymoscelis dormei Gounelle, 1910 (Brazil)
- Rhathymoscelis haldemanii Thomson, 1861 (Guatemala and Mexico)
- Rhathymoscelis melzeri Costa Lima, 1922 (Brazil)
- Rhathymoscelis monnei Vlasak & Santos-Silva, 2026 (Peru)
- Rhathymoscelis mortieri Dalens & Touroult, 2014 (French Guiana)
- Rhathymoscelis peruibensis Lane, 1951 (Brazil)
- Rhathymoscelis rothschildi Lane, 1965 (Mexico)
- Rhathymoscelis taunayi Lane, 1936 (Brazil)
- Rhathymoscelis wheeleri Lane, 1974 (Guyana and French Guiana)
- Rhathymoscelis zikani Melzer, 1931 (Brazil)
