= Dodecosis nigricornis =

Scientific classification
- Kingdom: Animalia
- Phylum: Arthropoda
- Class: Insecta
- Order: Coleoptera
- Suborder: Polyphaga
- Infraorder: Cucujiformia
- Family: Cerambycidae
- Genus: Dodecosis
- Species: D. nigricornis

Binomial name
- Dodecosis nigricornis Martins & Galileo, 1991

Species of beetle

Dodecosis nigricornis is a species of beetle in the family Cerambycidae. It was described by Martins and Galileo, 1991.
