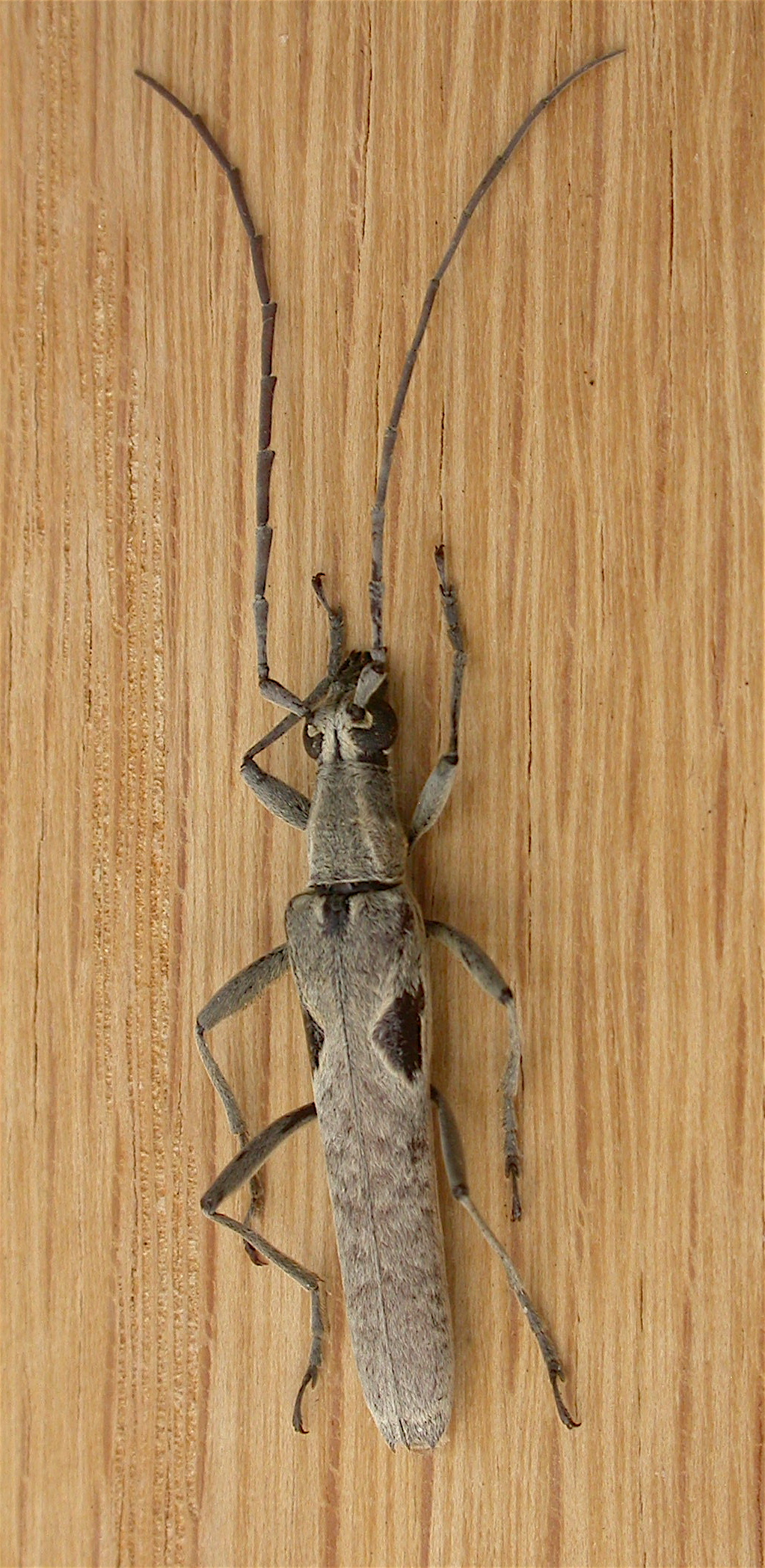
- Uracanthus triangularis

Scientific classification
- Kingdom: Animalia
- Phylum: Arthropoda
- Clade: Pancrustacea
- Class: Insecta
- Order: Coleoptera
- Suborder: Polyphaga
- Infraorder: Cucujiformia
- Family: Cerambycidae
- Subfamily: Cerambycinae
- Tribe: Uracanthini

= Uracanthini =

Tribe of beetles

Uracanthini is a tribe of beetles in the subfamily Cerambycinae, containing 6 genera.

== Genera ==
- Aethiora Pascoe, 1865
- Emenica Pascoe, 1875
- Neouracanthus McKeown, 1938
- Rhinophthalmus Thomson, 1861
- Scolecobrotus Hope, 1833
- Uracanthus Hope, 1833
