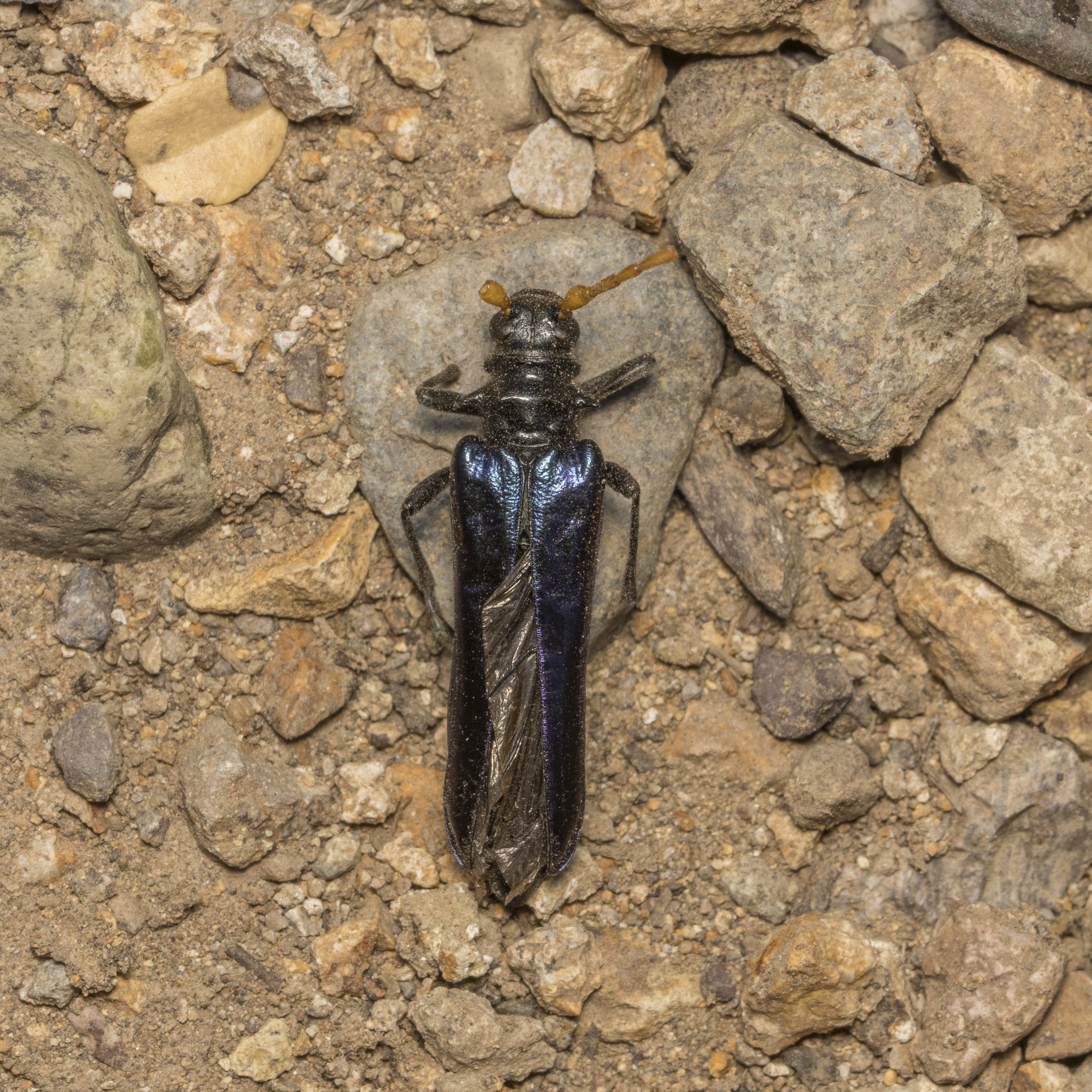
- Hephaestion pallidicornis, Chile

Scientific classification
- Kingdom: Animalia
- Phylum: Arthropoda
- Class: Insecta
- Order: Coleoptera
- Suborder: Polyphaga
- Infraorder: Cucujiformia
- Superfamily: Chrysomeloidea
- Family: Cerambycidae
- Subfamily: Cerambycinae
- Genus: Hephaestion; Newman, 1840

Synonyms
- Hepilaestion Newman, 1840

= Hephaestion (beetle) =

Genus of beetles

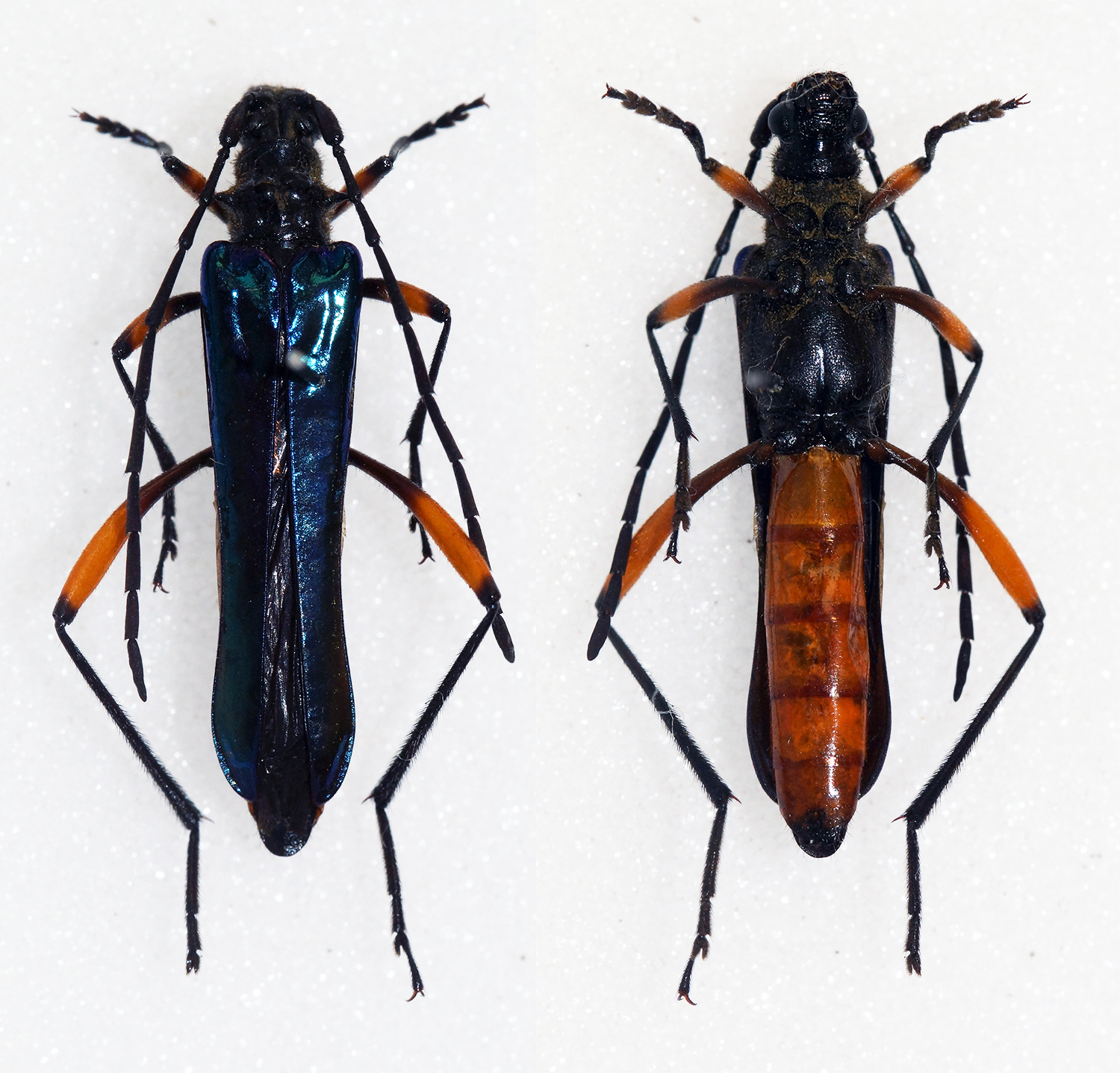
Hephaestion ochreatum

Hephaestion is a genus in the longhorn beetle family Cerambycidae. There are about 16 described species in Hephaestion, found in Chile and Argentina.

== Species ==
These 16 species belong to the genus Hephaestion:

- Hephaestion annulatus F. Philippi, 1859 (Argentina and Chile)
- Hephaestion auratum Cerda, 1968 (Chile)
- Hephaestion bullocki Cerda, 1968 (Chile)
- Hephaestion chalybeus R. Philippi, 1865 (Chile)
- Hephaestion corralensis R. Philippi & F. Philippi, 1864 (Chile)
- Hephaestion cyanopterus R. Philippi & F. Philippi, 1864 (Chile)
- Hephaestion flavicornis R. Philippi & F. Philippi, 1864 (Chile)
- Hephaestion fuscescens R. Philippi & F. Philippi, 1864 (Chile)
- Hephaestion holomelas R. Philippi & F. Philippi, 1864 (Chile)
- Hephaestion lariosi Bosq, 1951 (Chile)
- Hephaestion nigricornis Fairmaire & Germain, 1861 (Chile)
- Hephaestion ocreatus Newman, 1840 (Chile)
- Hephaestion pallidicornis Fairmaire & Germain, 1859 (Chile)
- Hephaestion tolhuaca Cerda, 1995 (Chile)
- Hephaestion versicolor F. Philippi, 1859 (Chile)
- Hephaestion violaceipennis Fairmaire & Germain, 1861 (Argentina and Chile)
