= Calderia =

Scientific classification
- Domain: Eukaryota
- Kingdom: Animalia
- Phylum: Arthropoda
- Class: Insecta
- Order: Coleoptera
- Suborder: Polyphaga
- Infraorder: Cucujiformia
- Family: Cerambycidae
- Genus: Calderia; Ślipiński & Escalona, 2016
- Species: C. windsorensis

Binomial name
- Calderia windsorensis Ślipiński & Escalona, 2016

Genus of beetles

Calderia is a monotypic genus of longhorned beetles in the family Cerambycidae. This genus has a single species, Calderia windsorensis, found in northeastern Australia.
