= Wappesia gahani =

Scientific classification
- Kingdom: Animalia
- Phylum: Arthropoda
- Clade: Pancrustacea
- Class: Insecta
- Order: Coleoptera
- Suborder: Polyphaga
- Infraorder: Cucujiformia
- Family: Cerambycidae
- Genus: Wappesia
- Species: W. gahani

Binomial name
- Wappesia gahani (Gounelle, 1911)

Synonyms
- Oxycoleus gahani (Gounelle, 1911); Tethlimmena gahani Gounelle, 1911

Species of beetle

Wappesia gahani is a species of beetle in the family Cerambycidae. It was described by Gounelle in 1911.
