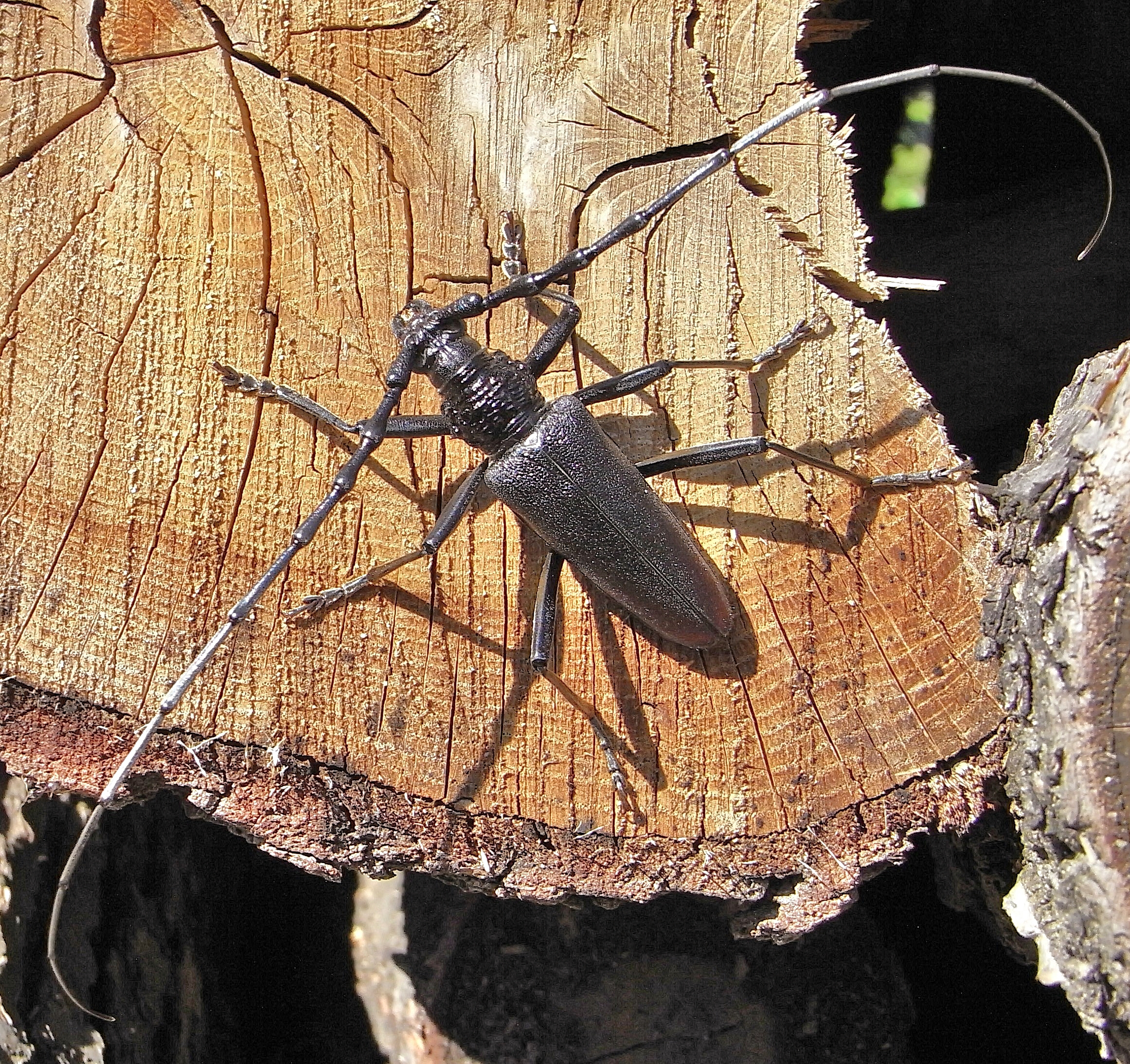
- Cerambyx cerdo from the Mátra, Hungary

Scientific classification
- Kingdom: Animalia
- Phylum: Arthropoda
- Clade: Pancrustacea
- Class: Insecta
- Order: Coleoptera
- Suborder: Polyphaga
- Infraorder: Cucujiformia
- Family: Cerambycidae
- Subfamily: Cerambycinae; Latreille, 1802

= Cerambycinae =

Subfamily of beetles

Cerambycinae is a subfamily of the longhorn beetle family (Cerambycidae). The subfamily has a world-wide distribution including: Asia, Europe and the Americas (with 430 species in 130 genera in the neotropical realm). Within the family, the only subfamily of comparable diversity is the Lamiinae.

== Distribution ==
Cerambycines are found worldwide; in the Americas, especially widely distributed in the neotropical regions.

== Identification ==
The major distinguishing factors are the bluntness of the last segment of the maxillary palp, its slanting or near vertical face, the rounded pronotum, and the elytra are often the widest in the middle.

== Tribes ==
The subfamily Cerambycinae contains the following tribes:

1. Acangassuini Galileo & Martins, 2001
2. Achrysonini Lacordaire, 1869
3. Agallissini LeConte, 1873
4. Alanizini Di Iorio, 2003
5. Amphoecini Breuning, 1951
6. Anaglyptini Lacordaire, 1869
7. Aphanasiini Lacordaire, 1868
8. Aphneopini Lacordaire, 1868
9. Auxesini Lacordaire, 1872
10. Basipterini Fragoso, Monne & Campos Seabra, 1987
11. Bimiini Lacordaire, 1868
12. Bothriospilini Lane, 1950
13. Brachypteromini Sama, 2008
14. Callichromatini Blanchard, 1845
15. Callidiini Mulsant, 1839
16. Callidiopini Lacordaire, 1868
17. Cerambycini Latreille, 1802
18. Certallini Fairmaire, 1864
19. Chlidonini Waterhouse, 1879
20. Cleomenini Lacordaire, 1868
21. Clytini Mulsant, 1839
22. Coelarthrini Lacordaire, 1869
23. Compsocerini Thomson, 1864
24. Coptommatini Lacordaire, 1869
25. Curiini LeConte, 1873
26. Dedyini Lepesme & Breuning, 1955
27. Deilini Fairmaire, 1864
28. Dejanirini Lacordaire, 1868
29. Dichophyiini Gistel, 1848
30. Diorini Lane, 1950
31. Distichocerini Pascoe, 1867
32. Dodecosini Aurivillius, 1912
33. Dryobiini Linsley, 1964
34. Eburiini Blanchard, 1845
35. Ectenessini Martins, 1998
36. Elaphidiini Thomson, 1864
37. Eligmodermini Lacordaire, 1868
38. Erlandiini Aurivillius, 1912
39. Eroschemini Lacordaire, 1868
40. Eumichthini Linsley, 1940
41. Gahaniini Quentin & Villiers, 1969
42. Glaucytini Lacordaire, 1868
43. Graciliini Mulsant, 1839
44. Hesperophanini Mulsant, 1839
45. Hesthesini Pascoe, 1867
46. Heteropsini Lacordaire 1868
47. Hexoplonini Martins, 2006
48. Holopleurini Chemsak & Linsley, 1974
49. Holopterini Lacordaire, 1868
50. Hyboderini Linsley, 1940
51. Hylotrupini Rose, 1983
52. Ibidionini Thomson, 1861
53. Ideratini Martins & Napp, 2009
54. Lissonotini Thomson, 1860
55. Luscosmodicini Martins, 2003
56. Macronini Lacordaire, 1868
57. Megacoelini Quentin & Villiers, 1969
58. Methiini Thomson, 1860
59. Molorchini Mulsant, 1863
60. Mythodini Lacordaire, 1868
61. Necydalopsini Lacordaire, 1868
62. Neocorini Martins, 2005
63. Neostenini Lacordaire, 1868
64. Obriini Mulsant, 1839
65. Oedenoderini Aurivillius, 1912
66. Oemini Pascoe, 1869
67. Opsimini LeConte, 1813
68. Oxycoleini Martins & Galileo, 2003
69. Paraholopterini Martins, 1997
70. Phalotini Lacordaire, 1868
71. Phlyctaenodini Lacordaire, 1868
72. Phoracanthini Newman, 1840
73. Phyllarthriini Lepesme & Breuning, 1956
74. Piezocerini Lacordaire, 1869
75. Platyarthrini Bates, 1870
76. Plectogasterini Quentin & Villiers, 1969
77. Plectromerini Nearns & Braham, 2008
78. Pleiarthrocerini Lane, 1950
79. Plesioclytini Wappes & Skelly, 2015
80. Proholopterini Monné, 2012
81. Protaxini Gahan, 1906
82. Prothemini Lacordaire, 1868
83. Psebiini Lacordaire, 1869
84. Pseudocephalini Aurivillius, 1912 (1861)
85. Pseudolepturini Thomson, 1861
86. Psilomorphini Lacordaire, 1868
87. Pteroplatini Thomson, 1861
88. Pyrestini Lacordaire, 1868
89. Pytheini Thomson, 1864
90. Rhagiomorphini Newman, 1841
91. Rhinotragini Thomson, 1860
92. Rhopalophorini Blanchard, 1845
93. Sestyrini Lacordaire, 1868
94. Smodicini Lacordaire, 1869
95. Spintheriini Lacordaire, 1869
96. Stenhomalini Miroshnikov, 1989
97. Stenoderini Pascoe, 1867
98. Stenopterini Fairmaire, 1864
99. Strongylurini Lacordaire, 1868
100. Sydacini Martins, 2014
101. Tessarommatini Lacordaire, 1868
102. Thraniini Gahan, 1906
103. Thyrsiini Marinoni & Napp, 1984
104. Tillomorphini Lacordaire, 1869
105. Torneutini Thomson, 1861
106. Trachyderini Dupont, 1836
107. Tragocerini Pascoe, 1867
108. Trichomesini Pascoe, 1859
109. Trigonarthrini Villiers, 1984
110. Tropidini Martins & Galileo, 2007
111. Tropocalymmatini Lacordaire, 1868
112. Typhocesini Lacordaire, 1868
113. Unxiini Napp, 2007
114. Uracanthini Blanchard, 1853
115. Vesperellini Sama, 2008
116. Xystrocerini Blanchard, 1845

Genera incertae sedis

- Acanthoptera Perty, 1832
- Acideres Guérin-Méneville, 1858
- Allensundholmia Ślipiński & Escalona, 2016
- Atelopteryx Lacordaire, 1869
- Australodon Escalona & Ślipiński, 2011
- Calderia Ślipiński & Escalona, 2016
- Callisphyris Newman, 1840
- Cauarana Lane, 1974
- Chrisreidia Ślipiński & Escalona, 2016
- Championa Bates, 1880
- Dekeyzeria Ślipiński & Escalona, 2016
- Dendrides Dillon & Dillon, 1952
- Hasenpuschia Ślipiński & Escalona, 2016
- Hephaestioides Zajciw, 1961
- Hephaestion Newman, 1840
- Katerina Ślipiński & Escalona, 2016
- Kurandanus Ślipiński & Escalona, 2016
- Mendesina Lane, 1974
- Myacopterus Fairmaire, 1893
- Neclamia Lepesme & Breuning, 1952
- Oihus Dillon & Dillon, 1952
- Parahephaestion Melzer, 1930
- Planopus Bosq, 1953
- Rentzonella Ślipiński & Escalona, 2016
- Rhathymoscelis Thomson, 1861
- Stenorhopalus Blanchard, 1851
- Wattlemoria Ślipiński & Escalona, 2016
