= Neoibidionini =

Scientific classification
- Kingdom: Animalia
- Phylum: Arthropoda
- Class: Insecta
- Order: Coleoptera
- Suborder: Polyphaga
- Infraorder: Cucujiformia
- Family: Cerambycidae
- Subfamily: Cerambycinae
- Tribe: Neoibidionini; Monné, 2012

Tribe of beetles

Neoibidionini was a tribe of beetles in the subfamily Cerambycinae, but now normally placed in the Ibidionini.

It contained the following genera:

- Alcyopis
- Aneuthetochorus
- Aphatum
- Asynapteron
- Bomaribidion
- Brechmoidion
- Cecaibidion
- Cephaloplon
- Cicatrion
- Coleroidion
- Compsa
- Compsibidion
- Corimbion
- Cycnidolon
- Diasporidion
- Dodecaibidion
- Engyum
- Glomibidion
- Gnomibidion
- Hadroibidion
- Heterachthes
- Heterocompsa
- Homaloidion
- Hormathus
- Kolonibidion
- Kunaibidion
- Megaceron
- Megapedion
- Microibidion
- Minibidion
- Monzonia
- Neocompsa
- Neoctoplon
- Neoibidion
- Neopotiatuca
- Neotropidion
- Opacibidion
- Ophtalmibidion
- Opsibidion
- Palpibidion
- Paracompsa
- Perissomerus
- Phocibidion
- Prothoracibidion
- Psiloibidion
- Pubescibidion
- Pygmodeon
- Rhysium
- Smaragdion
- Stenoidion
- Sydax
- Tetraopidion
- Thoracibidion
- Trichoplon
- Tropidion
- Xalitla
