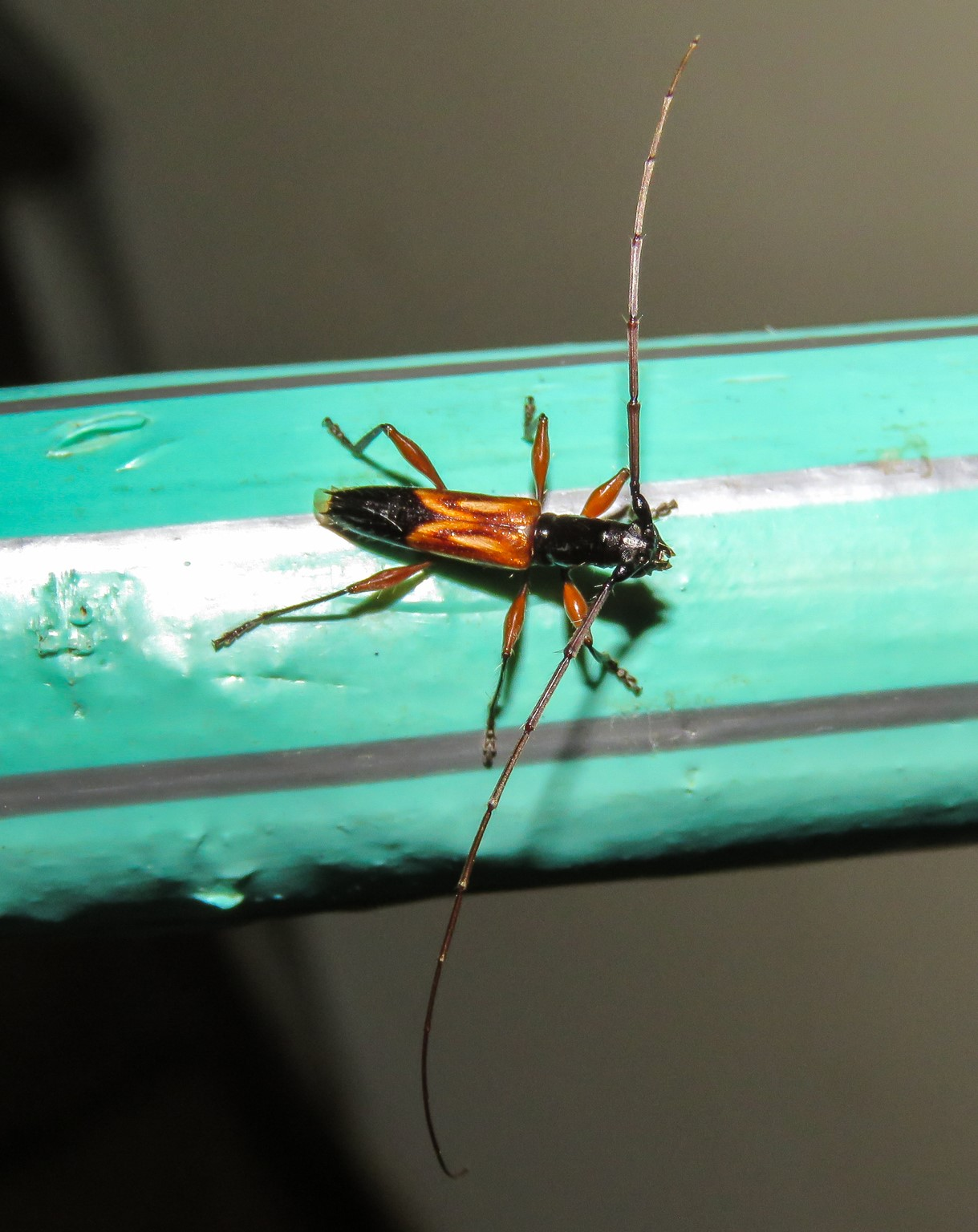
- Hexoplon speciosum

Scientific classification
- Kingdom: Animalia
- Phylum: Arthropoda
- Class: Insecta
- Order: Coleoptera
- Suborder: Polyphaga
- Infraorder: Cucujiformia
- Family: Cerambycidae
- Subfamily: Cerambycinae
- Tribe: Ibidionini; Thomson, 1860

Synonyms
- Ibidiinae Bates, 1870; Ibidiones LeConte, 1873; Ibidionides Lacordaire, 1869; Ibidionitae Thomson, 1860; Acangassuini Galileo & Martins, 2001 (nomen nudum); Compsina Martins & Galileo, 2007 (nomen nudum); Hexoplonini Martins, 2006 (nomen nudum); Sydacini Martins, 1997 (nomen nudum); Tropidina Martins & Galileo, 2007 (nomen nudum); Neoibidionini, Neoibidinini Monné, 2012 (unjustified replacement names?)

= Ibidionini =

Tribe of beetles

Ibidionini (a.k.a. Hexoplonini & Neoibidionini) is a tribe of beetles in the subfamily Cerambycinae.

== Genera ==
BioLib includes:

1. Acangarana Nascimento & Bravo, 2018
2. Acangassu Galileo & Martins, 2001
3. Alcyopis Pascoe, 1866
4. Aneuthetochorus Martins, 1968
5. Aphatum Bates, 1870
6. Asynapteron Martins, 1970
7. Bezarkia Martins & Galileo, 2014
8. Biraidion Galileo & Santos-Silva, 2016
9. Bomaribidion Martins, 1962
10. Brechmoidion Martins, 1969
11. Calycibidion Martins, 1971
12. Cecaibidion Galileo & Martins, 2001
13. Cephaloplon Martins & Napp, 1986
14. Chiquitano Santos-Silva, Galileo & Wappes, 2017
15. Cicatrion Martins, 1970
16. Coleroidion Martins, 1969
17. Compsa Perty, 1832
18. Compsibidion Thomson, 1864
19. Corimbion Martins, 1970
20. Ctenoplon Martins, 1967
21. Cycnidolon Thomson, 1864
22. Diasporidion Martins, 1968
23. Dodecaibidion Martins, 1962
24. Engyum Thomson, 1864
25. Epacroplon Martins, 1962
26. Glomibidion Napp & Martins, 1985
27. Glyptoceridion Martins, 1959
28. Glyptoscapus Aurivillius, 1899
29. Gnomibidion Martins, 1968
30. Gnomidolon Thomson, 1864
31. Hadroibidion Martins, 1967
32. Heterachthes Newman, 1840
33. Heterocompsa Martins, 1965
34. Hexocycnidolon Martins, 1960
35. Hexoplon Thomson, 1864
36. Homaloidion Martins, 1968
37. Hormathus Gahan, 1890
38. Ibidion Audinet-Serville, 1834
39. Isostenygra Martins & Galileo, 1999
40. Kolonibidion Martins, 2009
41. Kunaibidion Giesbert, 1998
42. Megaceron Martins, 1969
43. Megapedion Martins, 1968
44. Microibidion Martins, 1962
45. Minibidion Martins, 1968
46. Monzonia Giesbert, 1998
47. Neocompsa Martins, 1965
48. Neoctoplon Martins, 1969
49. Neognomidolon Martins, 1967
50. Neopotiatuca Martins & Galileo, 2007
51. Neotropidion Martins, 1968
52. Notosphaeridion Martins, 1960
53. Opacibidion Martins, 1968
54. Ophtalmibidion Martins, 1969
55. Ophtalmoplon Martins, 1965
56. Opsibidion Martins, 1960
57. Palpibidion Martins & Galileo, 2003
58. Paracompsa Martins, 2009
59. Paratetroplon Audureau, 2015
60. Perissomerus Gounelle, 1909
61. Phocibidion Martins, 1968
62. Pronoplon Martins, 1967
63. Prothoracibidion Martins, 1960
64. Pseudoplon Martins, 1971
65. Psiloibidion Martins, 1968
66. Pubescibidion Martins, 2009
67. Pygmodeon Martins, 1970
68. Rhysium Pascoe, 1866
69. Smaragdion Martins, 1968
70. Spinoplon Napp & Martins, 1985
71. Stenoidion Martins, 1970
72. Stenygra Audinet-Serville, 1834
73. Sydax Lacordaire, 1869
74. Tapuruia Lane, 1973
75. Tetraibidion Martins, 1967
76. Tetraopidion Martins, 1960
77. Tetroplon Aurivillius, 1899
78. Thoracibidion Martins, 1960
79. Trichoplon Martins, 1967
80. Tropidion Thomson, 1867
81. Uirassu Martins & Galileo, 2010
82. Xalitla Lane, 1959
