= Megaceron australe =

Scientific classification
- Kingdom: Animalia
- Phylum: Arthropoda
- Class: Insecta
- Order: Coleoptera
- Suborder: Polyphaga
- Infraorder: Cucujiformia
- Family: Cerambycidae
- Genus: Megaceron
- Species: M. australe

Binomial name
- Megaceron australe (Martins, 1960)

Species of beetle

Megaceron australe is a species of beetle in the family Cerambycidae. It was described by Martins in 1960.

== See also ==
- Megaceron

Megaceron antennicrassum
