= Stenoidion schmidi =

Scientific classification
- Kingdom: Animalia
- Phylum: Arthropoda
- Class: Insecta
- Order: Coleoptera
- Suborder: Polyphaga
- Infraorder: Cucujiformia
- Family: Cerambycidae
- Genus: Stenoidion
- Species: S. schmidi

Binomial name
- Stenoidion schmidi Martins & Galileo, 2009

Species of beetle

Stenoidion schmidi is a species of beetle in the family Cerambycidae. It was described by Martins and Galileo in 2009.
