= Engyum howdeni =

Scientific classification
- Kingdom: Animalia
- Phylum: Arthropoda
- Class: Insecta
- Order: Coleoptera
- Suborder: Polyphaga
- Infraorder: Cucujiformia
- Family: Cerambycidae
- Genus: Engyum
- Species: E. howdeni

Binomial name
- Engyum howdeni Martins & Napp, 1986

Species of beetle

Engyum howdeni is a species of beetle in the family Cerambycidae. It was described by Martins and Napp in 1986.
