= Coleroidion cingulum =

Scientific classification
- Kingdom: Animalia
- Phylum: Arthropoda
- Class: Insecta
- Order: Coleoptera
- Suborder: Polyphaga
- Infraorder: Cucujiformia
- Family: Cerambycidae
- Genus: Coleroidion
- Species: C. cingulum

Binomial name
- Coleroidion cingulum Martins, 1969

Species of beetle

Coleroidion cingulum is a species of beetle in the family Cerambycidae. It was described by Martins in 1969.
