= Engyum quadrinotatum =

Scientific classification
- Kingdom: Animalia
- Phylum: Arthropoda
- Class: Insecta
- Order: Coleoptera
- Suborder: Polyphaga
- Infraorder: Cucujiformia
- Family: Cerambycidae
- Genus: Engyum
- Species: E. quadrinotatum

Binomial name
- Engyum quadrinotatum Thomson, 1864

Species of beetle

Engyum quadrinotatum is a species of beetle in the family Cerambycidae. It was described by Thomson in 1864.
