= Tetraibidion concolor =

Scientific classification
- Kingdom: Animalia
- Phylum: Arthropoda
- Class: Insecta
- Order: Coleoptera
- Suborder: Polyphaga
- Infraorder: Cucujiformia
- Family: Cerambycidae
- Genus: Tetraibidion
- Species: T. concolor

Binomial name
- Tetraibidion concolor Martins, 2006

Species of beetle

Tetraibidion concolor is a species of beetle in the family Cerambycidae. It was described by Martins in 2006.
