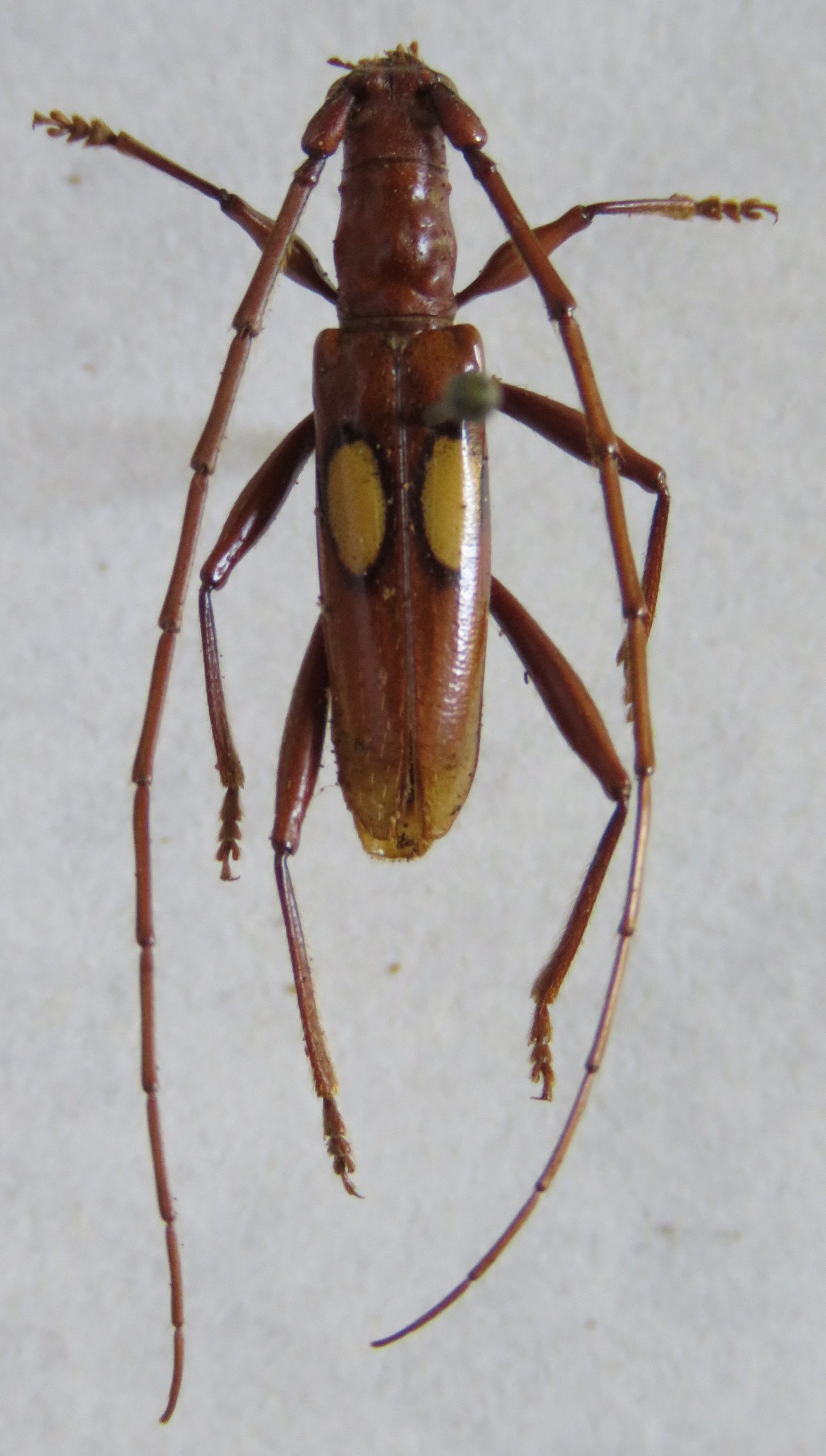

Scientific classification
- Domain: Eukaryota
- Kingdom: Animalia
- Phylum: Arthropoda
- Class: Insecta
- Order: Coleoptera
- Suborder: Polyphaga
- Infraorder: Cucujiformia
- Family: Cerambycidae
- Genus: Diasporidion
- Species: D. duplicatum

Binomial name
- Diasporidion duplicatum (Gounelle, 1909)

= Diasporidion duplicatum =

Species of beetle

Diasporidion duplicatum is a species of beetle in the family Cerambycidae. It was described by Gounelle in 1909.
