= Tapuruia =

Scientific classification
- Kingdom: Animalia
- Phylum: Arthropoda
- Class: Insecta
- Order: Coleoptera
- Suborder: Polyphaga
- Infraorder: Cucujiformia
- Family: Cerambycidae
- Tribe: Ibidionini
- Genus: Tapuruia

Genus of beetles

Tapuruia is a genus of beetles in the family Cerambycidae, containing the following species:

- Tapuruia beebei (Fisher, 1944)
- Tapuruia felisbertoi Lane, 1973
- Tapuruia jolyi Napp & Martins, 1985
