= Sydax gibbus =

Scientific classification
- Kingdom: Animalia
- Phylum: Arthropoda
- Class: Insecta
- Order: Coleoptera
- Suborder: Polyphaga
- Infraorder: Cucujiformia
- Family: Cerambycidae
- Genus: Sydax
- Species: S. gibbus

Binomial name
- Sydax gibbus Joly, 1985

Species of beetle

Sydax gibbus is a species of beetle in the family Cerambycidae. It was described by Joly in 1985.
