= Hormathus giesberti =

Scientific classification
- Kingdom: Animalia
- Phylum: Arthropoda
- Class: Insecta
- Order: Coleoptera
- Suborder: Polyphaga
- Infraorder: Cucujiformia
- Family: Cerambycidae
- Genus: Hormathus
- Species: H. giesberti

Binomial name
- Hormathus giesberti Lingafelter & Nearns, 2007

Species of beetle

Hormathus giesberti is a species of beetle in the family Cerambycidae. It was described by Lingafelter and Nearns in 2007.
