= Aneuthetochorus conjunctus =

Scientific classification
- Kingdom: Animalia
- Phylum: Arthropoda
- Class: Insecta
- Order: Coleoptera
- Suborder: Polyphaga
- Infraorder: Cucujiformia
- Family: Cerambycidae
- Genus: Aneuthetochorus
- Species: A. conjunctus

Binomial name
- Aneuthetochorus conjunctus Napp & Martins, 1984

Species of beetle

Aneuthetochorus conjunctus is a species of beetle in the family Cerambycidae. It was described by Napp and Martins in 1984.
