= Neotropidion pulchellum =

Scientific classification
- Kingdom: Animalia
- Phylum: Arthropoda
- Class: Insecta
- Order: Coleoptera
- Suborder: Polyphaga
- Infraorder: Cucujiformia
- Family: Cerambycidae
- Genus: Neotropidion
- Species: N. pulchellum

Binomial name
- Neotropidion pulchellum Martins, 1968

Species of beetle

Neotropidion pulchellum is a species of beetle in the family Cerambycidae. It was described by Martins in 1968.
