= Engyum fusiferum =

Scientific classification
- Kingdom: Animalia
- Phylum: Arthropoda
- Class: Insecta
- Order: Coleoptera
- Suborder: Polyphaga
- Infraorder: Cucujiformia
- Family: Cerambycidae
- Genus: Engyum
- Species: E. fusiferum

Binomial name
- Engyum fusiferum (Audinet-Serville, 1834)

Species of beetle

Engyum fusiferum is a species of beetle in the family Cerambycidae. It was described by Audinet-Serville in 1834.
