= Megapedion lefebvrei =

Scientific classification
- Kingdom: Animalia
- Phylum: Arthropoda
- Class: Insecta
- Order: Coleoptera
- Suborder: Polyphaga
- Infraorder: Cucujiformia
- Family: Cerambycidae
- Genus: Megapedion
- Species: M. lefebvrei

Binomial name
- Megapedion lefebvrei (Gounelle, 1909)

Species of beetle

Megapedion lefebvrei is a species of beetle in the family Cerambycidae. It was described by Gounelle in 1909.
