= Notosphaeridion =

Scientific classification
- Kingdom: Animalia
- Phylum: Arthropoda
- Class: Insecta
- Order: Coleoptera
- Suborder: Polyphaga
- Infraorder: Cucujiformia
- Family: Cerambycidae
- Tribe: Ibidionini
- Genus: Notosphaeridion; Martins, 1960

Genus of beetles

Notosphaeridion is a genus of beetles in the family Cerambycidae, containing the following species:

- Notosphaeridion brevithorax (Martins, 1960)
- Notosphaeridion scabrosum (Gounelle, 1909)
- Notosphaeridion umbrinum Martins, 1971
- Notosphaeridion vestitum Martins, 1960
