= Ophtalmibidion tetrops =

Scientific classification
- Kingdom: Animalia
- Phylum: Arthropoda
- Clade: Pancrustacea
- Class: Insecta
- Order: Coleoptera
- Suborder: Polyphaga
- Infraorder: Cucujiformia
- Family: Cerambycidae
- Genus: Ophtalmibidion
- Species: O. tetrops

Binomial name
- Ophtalmibidion tetrops (Bates, 1870)

Species of beetle

Ophtalmibidion tetrops is a species of beetle in the family Cerambycidae. It was described by Henry Walter Bates in 1870. It is found in Brazil (Pará, Mato Grosso, Mato Grosso do Sul, Minas Gerais, São Paulo, Paraná), Peru, Bolivia (Santa Cruz), Paraguay and Argentina (Misiones).
