= Hormathus cinctellus =

Scientific classification
- Kingdom: Animalia
- Phylum: Arthropoda
- Class: Insecta
- Order: Coleoptera
- Suborder: Polyphaga
- Infraorder: Cucujiformia
- Family: Cerambycidae
- Genus: Hormathus
- Species: H. cinctellus

Binomial name
- Hormathus cinctellus Gahan, 1890

Species of beetle

Hormathus cinctellus is a species of beetle in the family Cerambycidae. It was described by Gahan in 1890.
