= Tapuruia felisbertoi =

Scientific classification
- Kingdom: Animalia
- Phylum: Arthropoda
- Class: Insecta
- Order: Coleoptera
- Suborder: Polyphaga
- Infraorder: Cucujiformia
- Family: Cerambycidae
- Genus: Tapuruia
- Species: T. felisbertoi

Binomial name
- Tapuruia felisbertoi Lane, 1973

Species of beetle

Tapuruia felisbertoi is a species of beetle in the family Cerambycidae. It was described by Lane in 1973.
