= Cycnidolon bruchi =

Scientific classification
- Domain: Eukaryota
- Kingdom: Animalia
- Phylum: Arthropoda
- Class: Insecta
- Order: Coleoptera
- Suborder: Polyphaga
- Infraorder: Cucujiformia
- Family: Cerambycidae
- Genus: Cycnidolon
- Species: C. bruchi

Binomial name
- Cycnidolon bruchi Napp & Martins, 1985

Species of beetle

Cycnidolon bruchi is a species of beetle in the family Cerambycidae. It was described by Napp and Martins in 1985.
