= Cycnidolon binodosum =

Scientific classification
- Domain: Eukaryota
- Kingdom: Animalia
- Phylum: Arthropoda
- Class: Insecta
- Order: Coleoptera
- Suborder: Polyphaga
- Infraorder: Cucujiformia
- Family: Cerambycidae
- Genus: Cycnidolon
- Species: C. binodosum

Binomial name
- Cycnidolon binodosum Bates, 1870

Species of beetle

Cycnidolon binodosum is a species of beetle in the family Cerambycidae. It was described by Henry Walter Bates in 1870.
