= Pseudoplon =

Scientific classification
- Kingdom: Animalia
- Phylum: Arthropoda
- Class: Insecta
- Order: Coleoptera
- Suborder: Polyphaga
- Infraorder: Cucujiformia
- Family: Cerambycidae
- Tribe: Ibidionini
- Genus: Pseudoplon

Genus of beetles

Pseudoplon is a genus of beetles in the family Cerambycidae, containing the following species:

- Pseudoplon oculatum Martins, 1971
- Pseudoplon rasile Napp & Martins, 1985
- Pseudoplon transversum Napp & Martins, 1985
