= Sydax inexpectatus =

Scientific classification
- Kingdom: Animalia
- Phylum: Arthropoda
- Class: Insecta
- Order: Coleoptera
- Suborder: Polyphaga
- Infraorder: Cucujiformia
- Family: Cerambycidae
- Genus: Sydax
- Species: S. inexpectatus

Binomial name
- Sydax inexpectatus Martins, 1981

Species of beetle

Sydax inexpectatus is a species of beetle in the family Cerambycidae. It was described by Martins in 1981.
