= Ophtalmibidion auba =

Scientific classification
- Domain: Eukaryota
- Kingdom: Animalia
- Phylum: Arthropoda
- Class: Insecta
- Order: Coleoptera
- Suborder: Polyphaga
- Infraorder: Cucujiformia
- Family: Cerambycidae
- Genus: Ophtalmibidion
- Species: O. auba

Binomial name
- Ophtalmibidion auba Martins & Galileo, 1999

Species of beetle

Ophtalmibidion auba is a species of beetle in the family Cerambycidae. It was described by Martins and Galileo in 1999.
