= Sydax stramineus =

Scientific classification
- Kingdom: Animalia
- Phylum: Arthropoda
- Class: Insecta
- Order: Coleoptera
- Suborder: Polyphaga
- Infraorder: Cucujiformia
- Family: Cerambycidae
- Genus: Sydax
- Species: S. stramineus

Binomial name
- Sydax stramineus Lacordaire, 1869

Species of beetle

Sydax stramineus is a species of beetle in the family Cerambycidae. It was described by Lacordaire in 1869.
