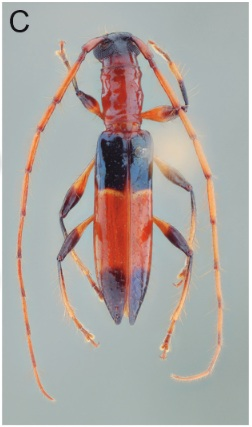
- Stenoidion corallinum chapadense

Scientific classification
- Kingdom: Animalia
- Phylum: Arthropoda
- Clade: Pancrustacea
- Class: Insecta
- Order: Coleoptera
- Suborder: Polyphaga
- Infraorder: Cucujiformia
- Family: Cerambycidae
- Genus: Stenoidion
- Species: S. corallinum

Binomial name
- Stenoidion corallinum (Bates, 1870)

Synonyms
- Heterachthes corallina Bates, 1870; Heterachthes corallina var. tricolor Belon, 1896; Heterachthes corallina var. chapadensis Gounelle, 1909

= Stenoidion corallinum =

Species of beetle

Stenoidion corallinum is a species of beetle in the family Cerambycidae. It was described by Bates in 1870. It is found in Bolivia, Brazil, French Guiana and Peru.

== Subspecies ==
- Stenoidion corallinum corallinum
- Stenoidion corallinum chapadense (Gounelle, 1909)
- Stenoidion corallinum tricolor (Belon, 1896)
