= Calycibidion =

Scientific classification
- Kingdom: Animalia
- Phylum: Arthropoda
- Class: Insecta
- Order: Coleoptera
- Suborder: Polyphaga
- Infraorder: Cucujiformia
- Family: Cerambycidae
- Tribe: Ibidionini
- Genus: Calycibidion

Genus of beetle

Calycibidion is a genus of beetles in the family Cerambycidae, containing the following species:

- Calycibidion multicavum Martins, 1971
- Calycibidion rubricolle Galileo & Martins, 2010
- Calycibidion turbidum Napp & Martins, 1985
