= Dodecaibidion ornatipenne =

Scientific classification
- Kingdom: Animalia
- Phylum: Arthropoda
- Class: Insecta
- Order: Coleoptera
- Suborder: Polyphaga
- Infraorder: Cucujiformia
- Family: Cerambycidae
- Genus: Dodecaibidion
- Species: D. ornatipenne

Binomial name
- Dodecaibidion ornatipenne Martins, 1970

Species of beetle

Dodecaibidion ornatipenne is a species of beetle in the family Cerambycidae. It was described by Martins in 1970.
