= Corimbion martinsi =

Scientific classification
- Kingdom: Animalia
- Phylum: Arthropoda
- Class: Insecta
- Order: Coleoptera
- Suborder: Polyphaga
- Infraorder: Cucujiformia
- Family: Cerambycidae
- Genus: Corimbion
- Species: C. martinsi

Binomial name
- Corimbion martinsi Giesbert, 1998

Species of beetle

Corimbion martinsi is a species of beetle in the family Cerambycidae. It was described by Giesbert in 1998.
