= Calycibidion rubricolle =

Scientific classification
- Kingdom: Animalia
- Phylum: Arthropoda
- Clade: Pancrustacea
- Class: Insecta
- Order: Coleoptera
- Suborder: Polyphaga
- Infraorder: Cucujiformia
- Family: Cerambycidae
- Genus: Calycibidion
- Species: C. rubricolle

Binomial name
- Calycibidion rubricolle Galileo & Martins, 2010

Species of beetle

Calycibidion rubricolle is a species of beetle in the family Cerambycidae. It was described by Galileo and Martins in 2010.
