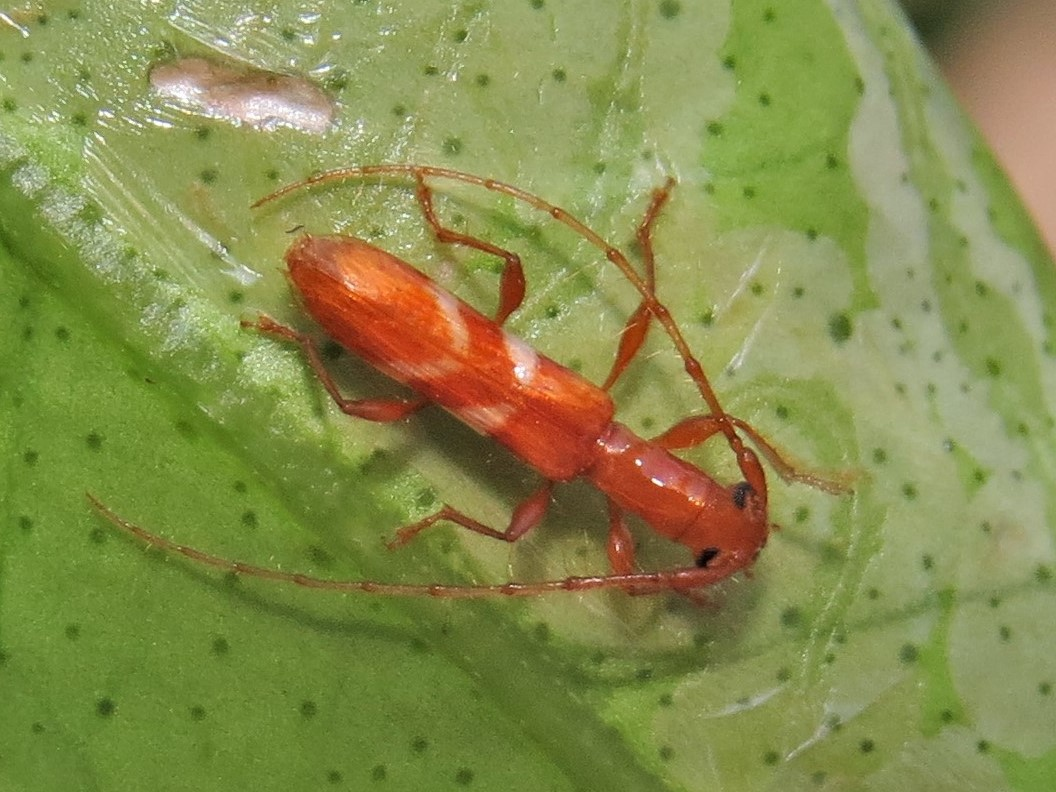

Scientific classification
- Domain: Eukaryota
- Kingdom: Animalia
- Phylum: Arthropoda
- Class: Insecta
- Order: Coleoptera
- Suborder: Polyphaga
- Infraorder: Cucujiformia
- Family: Cerambycidae
- Genus: Opsibidion
- Species: O. albinum

Binomial name
- Opsibidion albinum (Bates, 1870)

= Opsibidion albinum =

Species of beetle

Opsibidion albinum is a species of beetle in the family Cerambycidae. It was described by Bates in 1870.
