= Notosphaeridion umbrinum =

Scientific classification
- Kingdom: Animalia
- Phylum: Arthropoda
- Class: Insecta
- Order: Coleoptera
- Suborder: Polyphaga
- Infraorder: Cucujiformia
- Family: Cerambycidae
- Genus: Notosphaeridion
- Species: N. umbrinum

Binomial name
- Notosphaeridion umbrinum Martins, 1971

Species of beetle

Notosphaeridion umbrinum is a species of beetle in the family Cerambycidae. It was described by Martins in 1971.
