= Paracompsa latifascia =

Scientific classification
- Kingdom: Animalia
- Phylum: Arthropoda
- Class: Insecta
- Order: Coleoptera
- Suborder: Polyphaga
- Infraorder: Cucujiformia
- Family: Cerambycidae
- Genus: Paracompsa
- Species: P. latifascia

Binomial name
- Paracompsa latifascia (Martins, 1970)

Species of beetle

Paracompsa latifascia is a species of beetle in the family Cerambycidae. It was described by Martins in 1970.
