= Megapedion sylphis =

Scientific classification
- Kingdom: Animalia
- Phylum: Arthropoda
- Clade: Pancrustacea
- Class: Insecta
- Order: Coleoptera
- Suborder: Polyphaga
- Infraorder: Cucujiformia
- Family: Cerambycidae
- Genus: Megapedion
- Species: M. sylphis

Binomial name
- Megapedion sylphis (Bates, 1870)

Species of beetle

Megapedion sylphis is a species of beetle in the family Cerambycidae. It was described by Bates in 1870.
