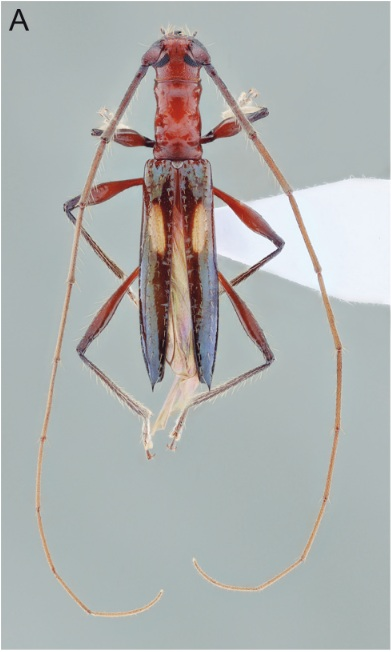

Scientific classification
- Kingdom: Animalia
- Phylum: Arthropoda
- Clade: Pancrustacea
- Class: Insecta
- Order: Coleoptera
- Suborder: Polyphaga
- Infraorder: Cucujiformia
- Family: Cerambycidae
- Genus: Neotropidion
- Species: N. nodicolle

Binomial name
- Neotropidion nodicolle (Dalman, 1823)

Synonyms
- Gnoma nodicollis Dalman, 1823; Ibidion armandinae Chabrillac, 1857; Ibidion biguttatum Redtenbacher, 1868; Ibidion biguttatum var. binocularis Gounelle, 1909

= Neotropidion nodicolle =

Species of beetle

Neotropidion nodicolle is a species of beetle in the family Cerambycidae. It was described by Dalman in 1823. It is found in Peru, Bolivia and Brazil (Acre, Amazonas, Pará, Mato Grosso, Bahia, Minas Gerais, Espirito Santo, Rio de Janeiro, São Paulo).

== Subspecies ==
- Neotropidion nodicolle nodicolle
- Neotropidion nodicolle binoculare (Gounelle, 1909)
