= Asynapteron contrarium =

Scientific classification
- Domain: Eukaryota
- Kingdom: Animalia
- Phylum: Arthropoda
- Class: Insecta
- Order: Coleoptera
- Suborder: Polyphaga
- Infraorder: Cucujiformia
- Family: Cerambycidae
- Genus: Asynapteron
- Species: A. contrarium

Binomial name
- Asynapteron contrarium Martins, 1971

Species of beetle

Asynapteron contrarium is a species of beetle in the family Cerambycidae. It was described by Martins in 1971.
