= Paracompsa flavofasciata =

Scientific classification
- Kingdom: Animalia
- Phylum: Arthropoda
- Class: Insecta
- Order: Coleoptera
- Suborder: Polyphaga
- Infraorder: Cucujiformia
- Family: Cerambycidae
- Genus: Paracompsa
- Species: P. flavofasciata

Binomial name
- Paracompsa flavofasciata (Thomson, 1867)

Species of beetle

Paracompsa flavofasciata is a species of beetle in the family Cerambycidae. It was described by Thomson in 1867.
