= Notosphaeridion scabrosum =

Scientific classification
- Kingdom: Animalia
- Phylum: Arthropoda
- Class: Insecta
- Order: Coleoptera
- Suborder: Polyphaga
- Infraorder: Cucujiformia
- Family: Cerambycidae
- Genus: Notosphaeridion
- Species: N. scabrosum

Binomial name
- Notosphaeridion scabrosum (Gounelle, 1909)

Species of beetle

Notosphaeridion scabrosum is a species of beetle in the family Cerambycidae. It was described by Gounelle in 1909.
