= Spinoplon =

Scientific classification
- Kingdom: Animalia
- Phylum: Arthropoda
- Class: Insecta
- Order: Coleoptera
- Suborder: Polyphaga
- Infraorder: Cucujiformia
- Family: Cerambycidae
- Tribe: Ibidionini
- Genus: Spinoplon

Genus of beetles

Spinoplon is a genus of beetles in the family Cerambycidae, containing the following species:

- Spinoplon bicolor Napp & Martins, 1985
- Spinoplon inusitatum Napp & Martins, 1985
- Spinoplon tutoia Martins, 2006
