= Ophtalmoplon simile =

Scientific classification
- Kingdom: Animalia
- Phylum: Arthropoda
- Class: Insecta
- Order: Coleoptera
- Suborder: Polyphaga
- Infraorder: Cucujiformia
- Family: Cerambycidae
- Genus: Ophtalmoplon
- Species: O. simile

Binomial name
- Ophtalmoplon simile Martins, Galileo & de-Oliveira, 2009

Species of beetle

Ophtalmoplon simile is a species of beetle in the family Cerambycidae. It was described by Martins, Galileo and de-Oliveira in 2009.
