= Cycnidolon sericeum =

Scientific classification
- Domain: Eukaryota
- Kingdom: Animalia
- Phylum: Arthropoda
- Class: Insecta
- Order: Coleoptera
- Suborder: Polyphaga
- Infraorder: Cucujiformia
- Family: Cerambycidae
- Genus: Cycnidolon
- Species: C. sericeum

Binomial name
- Cycnidolon sericeum Martins, 1960

Species of beetle

Cycnidolon sericeum is a species of beetle in the family Cerambycidae. It was described by Martins in 1960.
