= Tapuruia beebei =

Scientific classification
- Kingdom: Animalia
- Phylum: Arthropoda
- Class: Insecta
- Order: Coleoptera
- Suborder: Polyphaga
- Infraorder: Cucujiformia
- Family: Cerambycidae
- Genus: Tapuruia
- Species: T. beebei

Binomial name
- Tapuruia beebei (Fisher, 1944)

Species of beetle

Tapuruia beebei is a species of beetle in the family Cerambycidae. It was described by Fisher in 1944.
