= Dodecaibidion modestum =

Scientific classification
- Kingdom: Animalia
- Phylum: Arthropoda
- Class: Insecta
- Order: Coleoptera
- Suborder: Polyphaga
- Infraorder: Cucujiformia
- Family: Cerambycidae
- Genus: Dodecaibidion
- Species: D. modestum

Binomial name
- Dodecaibidion modestum Martins, 1970

Species of beetle

Dodecaibidion modestum is a species of beetle in the family Cerambycidae. It was described by Martins in 1970.
