= Alcyopis cyanoptera =

Scientific classification
- Domain: Eukaryota
- Kingdom: Animalia
- Phylum: Arthropoda
- Class: Insecta
- Order: Coleoptera
- Suborder: Polyphaga
- Infraorder: Cucujiformia
- Family: Cerambycidae
- Genus: Alcyopis
- Species: A. cyanoptera

Binomial name
- Alcyopis cyanoptera Pascoe, 1866

Species of beetle

Alcyopis cyanoptera is a species of beetle in the family Cerambycidae. It was described by Pascoe in 1866.
