= Asynapteron inca =

Scientific classification
- Domain: Eukaryota
- Kingdom: Animalia
- Phylum: Arthropoda
- Class: Insecta
- Order: Coleoptera
- Suborder: Polyphaga
- Infraorder: Cucujiformia
- Family: Cerambycidae
- Genus: Asynapteron
- Species: A. inca

Binomial name
- Asynapteron inca (Martins, 1962)

Species of beetle

Asynapteron inca is a species of beetle in the family Cerambycidae. It was described by Martins in 1962.
