= Alcyopis chalcea =

Scientific classification
- Domain: Eukaryota
- Kingdom: Animalia
- Phylum: Arthropoda
- Class: Insecta
- Order: Coleoptera
- Suborder: Polyphaga
- Infraorder: Cucujiformia
- Family: Cerambycidae
- Genus: Alcyopis
- Species: A. chalcea

Binomial name
- Alcyopis chalcea Bates, 1874

Species of beetle

Alcyopis chalcea is a species of beetle in the family Cerambycidae. It was described by Bates in 1874.
