= Brechmoidion exicisifrons =

Scientific classification
- Kingdom: Animalia
- Phylum: Arthropoda
- Class: Insecta
- Order: Coleoptera
- Suborder: Polyphaga
- Infraorder: Cucujiformia
- Family: Cerambycidae
- Genus: Brechmoidion
- Species: B. exicisifrons

Binomial name
- Brechmoidion exicisifrons (Martins, 1960)

Species of beetle

Brechmoidion exicisifrons is a species of beetle in the family Cerambycidae. It was described by Martins in 1960.
