= Ophtalmoplon inerme =

Scientific classification
- Kingdom: Animalia
- Phylum: Arthropoda
- Class: Insecta
- Order: Coleoptera
- Suborder: Polyphaga
- Infraorder: Cucujiformia
- Family: Cerambycidae
- Genus: Ophtalmoplon
- Species: O. inerme

Binomial name
- Ophtalmoplon inerme Martins, 1965

Species of beetle

Ophtalmoplon inerme is a species of beetle in the family Cerambycidae. It was described by Martins in 1965.
