= Brechmoidion falcatum =

Scientific classification
- Kingdom: Animalia
- Phylum: Arthropoda
- Class: Insecta
- Order: Coleoptera
- Suborder: Polyphaga
- Infraorder: Cucujiformia
- Family: Cerambycidae
- Genus: Brechmoidion
- Species: B. falcatum

Binomial name
- Brechmoidion falcatum Napp & Martins, 1985

Species of beetle

Brechmoidion falcatum is a species of beetle in the family Cerambycidae. It was described by Napp and Martins in 1985.
