= Epacroplon armatipes =

Scientific classification
- Kingdom: Animalia
- Phylum: Arthropoda
- Class: Insecta
- Order: Coleoptera
- Suborder: Polyphaga
- Infraorder: Cucujiformia
- Family: Cerambycidae
- Genus: Epacroplon
- Species: E. armatipes

Binomial name
- Epacroplon armatipes (Martins, 1962)

Species of beetle

Epacroplon armatipes is a species of beetle in the family Cerambycidae. It was described by Martins in 1962.
