= Perissomerus dasytes =

Scientific classification
- Kingdom: Animalia
- Phylum: Arthropoda
- Class: Insecta
- Order: Coleoptera
- Suborder: Polyphaga
- Infraorder: Cucujiformia
- Family: Cerambycidae
- Genus: Perissomerus
- Species: P. dasytes

Binomial name
- Perissomerus dasytes Martins, 1968

Species of beetle

Perissomerus dasytes is a species of beetle in the family Cerambycidae. It was described by Martins in 1968.
