= Heterocompsa geniculata =

Scientific classification
- Kingdom: Animalia
- Phylum: Arthropoda
- Class: Insecta
- Order: Coleoptera
- Suborder: Polyphaga
- Infraorder: Cucujiformia
- Family: Cerambycidae
- Genus: Heterocompsa
- Species: H. geniculata

Binomial name
- Heterocompsa geniculata (Thomson, 1865)

Species of beetle

Heterocompsa geniculata is a species of beetle in the family Cerambycidae. It was described by Thomson in 1865.
