= Hadroibidion nanum =

Scientific classification
- Domain: Eukaryota
- Kingdom: Animalia
- Phylum: Arthropoda
- Class: Insecta
- Order: Coleoptera
- Suborder: Polyphaga
- Infraorder: Cucujiformia
- Family: Cerambycidae
- Genus: Hadroibidion
- Species: H. nanum

Binomial name
- Hadroibidion nanum (Gounelle, 1911)

Species of beetle

Hadroibidion nanum is a species of beetle in the family Cerambycidae. It was described by Gounelle in 1911.
