= Opacibidion rugicolle =

Scientific classification
- Kingdom: Animalia
- Phylum: Arthropoda
- Class: Insecta
- Order: Coleoptera
- Suborder: Polyphaga
- Infraorder: Cucujiformia
- Family: Cerambycidae
- Genus: Opacibidion
- Species: O. rugicolle

Binomial name
- Opacibidion rugicolle (Nonfried, 1895)

Species of beetle

Opacibidion rugicolle is a species of beetle in the family Cerambycidae. It was described by Nonfried in 1895.
