= Engyum ludibriosum =

Scientific classification
- Kingdom: Animalia
- Phylum: Arthropoda
- Class: Insecta
- Order: Coleoptera
- Suborder: Polyphaga
- Infraorder: Cucujiformia
- Family: Cerambycidae
- Genus: Engyum
- Species: E. ludibriosum

Binomial name
- Engyum ludibriosum Martins, 1970

Species of beetle

Engyum ludibriosum is a species of beetle in the family Cerambycidae. It was described by Martins in 1970.
