= Perissomerus ruficollis =

Scientific classification
- Kingdom: Animalia
- Phylum: Arthropoda
- Class: Insecta
- Order: Coleoptera
- Suborder: Polyphaga
- Infraorder: Cucujiformia
- Family: Cerambycidae
- Genus: Perissomerus
- Species: P. ruficollis

Binomial name
- Perissomerus ruficollis Martins, 1961

Species of beetle

Perissomerus ruficollis is a species of beetle in the family Cerambycidae. It was described by Martins in 1961.
