= Neognomidolon poecilum =

Scientific classification
- Kingdom: Animalia
- Phylum: Arthropoda
- Class: Insecta
- Order: Coleoptera
- Suborder: Polyphaga
- Infraorder: Cucujiformia
- Family: Cerambycidae
- Genus: Neognomidolon
- Species: N. poecilum

Binomial name
- Neognomidolon poecilum Martins, 1967

Species of beetle

Neognomidolon poecilum is a species of beetle in the family Cerambycidae. It was described by Martins in 1967.
