= Tetraibidion aurivillii =

Scientific classification
- Kingdom: Animalia
- Phylum: Arthropoda
- Clade: Pancrustacea
- Class: Insecta
- Order: Coleoptera
- Suborder: Polyphaga
- Infraorder: Cucujiformia
- Family: Cerambycidae
- Genus: Tetraibidion
- Species: T. aurivillii

Binomial name
- Tetraibidion aurivillii (Gounelle, 1909)

Species of beetle

Tetraibidion aurivillii is a species of beetle in the family Cerambycidae. It was described by Gounelle in 1909. It is found in Brazil (Goiás, Pernambuco, Bahia, Minas Gerais, Espírito Santo, Rio de Janeiro, São Paulo, Paraná, Santa Catarina, Rio Grande do Sul), Bolivia (Santa Cruz), Paraguay and Argentina (Misiones).
