= Cycnidolon minutum =

Scientific classification
- Kingdom: Animalia
- Phylum: Arthropoda
- Clade: Pancrustacea
- Class: Insecta
- Order: Coleoptera
- Suborder: Polyphaga
- Infraorder: Cucujiformia
- Family: Cerambycidae
- Genus: Cycnidolon
- Species: C. minutum

Binomial name
- Cycnidolon minutum Martins, 1960

Species of beetle

Cycnidolon minutum is a species of beetle in the family Cerambycidae. It was described by Martins in 1960. It is found in Brazil (Bahia, Minas Gerais, Espírito Santo, Rio de Janeiro, São Paulo, Paraná) and Argentina (Misiones).
