= Ophtalmibidion luscum =

Scientific classification
- Domain: Eukaryota
- Kingdom: Animalia
- Phylum: Arthropoda
- Class: Insecta
- Order: Coleoptera
- Suborder: Polyphaga
- Infraorder: Cucujiformia
- Family: Cerambycidae
- Genus: Ophtalmibidion
- Species: O. luscum

Binomial name
- Ophtalmibidion luscum Martins, 1971

Species of beetle

Ophtalmibidion luscum is a species of beetle in the family Cerambycidae. It was described by Martins in 1971.
