= Brechmoidion separatum =

Scientific classification
- Kingdom: Animalia
- Phylum: Arthropoda
- Class: Insecta
- Order: Coleoptera
- Suborder: Polyphaga
- Infraorder: Cucujiformia
- Family: Cerambycidae
- Genus: Brechmoidion
- Species: B. separatum

Binomial name
- Brechmoidion separatum Martins & Galileo, 2007

Species of beetle

Brechmoidion separatum is a species of beetle in the family Cerambycidae. It was described by Martins and Galileo in 2007.
