= Perissomerus hilairei =

Scientific classification
- Kingdom: Animalia
- Phylum: Arthropoda
- Class: Insecta
- Order: Coleoptera
- Suborder: Polyphaga
- Infraorder: Cucujiformia
- Family: Cerambycidae
- Genus: Perissomerus
- Species: P. hilairei

Binomial name
- Perissomerus hilairei Gounelle, 1909

Species of beetle

Perissomerus hilairei is a species of beetle in the family Cerambycidae. It was described by Gounelle in 1909.
