= Stenoidion apicatum =

Scientific classification
- Kingdom: Animalia
- Phylum: Arthropoda
- Class: Insecta
- Order: Coleoptera
- Suborder: Polyphaga
- Infraorder: Cucujiformia
- Family: Cerambycidae
- Genus: Stenoidion
- Species: S. apicatum

Binomial name
- Stenoidion apicatum (Martins, 1962)

Species of beetle

Stenoidion apicatum is a species of beetle in the family Cerambycidae. It was described by Martins in 1962.
