= Tetraibidion =

Scientific classification
- Kingdom: Animalia
- Phylum: Arthropoda
- Class: Insecta
- Order: Coleoptera
- Suborder: Polyphaga
- Infraorder: Cucujiformia
- Family: Cerambycidae
- Tribe: Ibidionini
- Genus: Tetraibidion

Genus of beetles

Tetraibidion is a genus of beetles in the family Cerambycidae, containing the following species:

- Tetraibidion aurivillii (Gounelle, 1909)
- Tetraibidion concolor Martins, 2006
- Tetraibidion ephimerum Martins, 1967
- Tetraibidion sahlbergi (Aurivillius, 1899)
