= Ophtalmoplon =

Scientific classification
- Kingdom: Animalia
- Phylum: Arthropoda
- Class: Insecta
- Order: Coleoptera
- Suborder: Polyphaga
- Infraorder: Cucujiformia
- Family: Cerambycidae
- Subfamily: Cerambycinae
- Tribe: Hexoplonini
- Genus: Ophtalmoplon; Martins, 1965

Genus of beetles

Ophtalmoplon is a genus of beetles in the family Cerambycidae, containing the following species:

- Ophtalmoplon aurivillii Martins, 1965
- Ophtalmoplon diversum Martins, 1965
- Ophtalmoplon impunctatum Martins, 1965
- Ophtalmoplon inerme Martins, 1965
- Ophtalmoplon nigricorne Napp & Martins, 1985
- Ophtalmoplon simile Martins, Galileo & de-Oliveira, 2009
- Ophtalmoplon spinosum Martins, 1965
