= Rhysium bimaculatum =

Scientific classification
- Kingdom: Animalia
- Phylum: Arthropoda
- Class: Insecta
- Order: Coleoptera
- Suborder: Polyphaga
- Infraorder: Cucujiformia
- Family: Cerambycidae
- Genus: Rhysium
- Species: R. bimaculatum

Binomial name
- Rhysium bimaculatum Pascoe, 1866

Species of beetle

Rhysium bimaculatum is a species of beetle in the family Cerambycidae. It was described by Pascoe in 1866.
