= Corimbion balteum =

Scientific classification
- Kingdom: Animalia
- Phylum: Arthropoda
- Class: Insecta
- Order: Coleoptera
- Suborder: Polyphaga
- Infraorder: Cucujiformia
- Family: Cerambycidae
- Genus: Corimbion
- Species: C. balteum

Binomial name
- Corimbion balteum Martins, 1970

Species of beetle

Corimbion balteum is a species of beetle in the family Cerambycidae. It was described by Martins in 1970.
