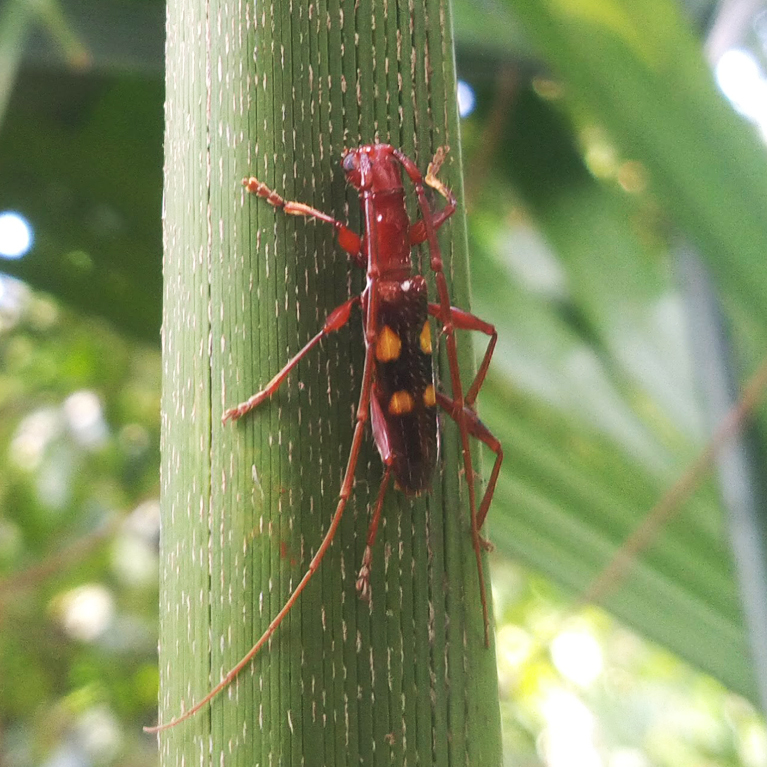

Scientific classification
- Domain: Eukaryota
- Kingdom: Animalia
- Phylum: Arthropoda
- Class: Insecta
- Order: Coleoptera
- Suborder: Polyphaga
- Infraorder: Cucujiformia
- Family: Cerambycidae
- Genus: Asynapteron
- Species: A. glabriolum

Binomial name
- Asynapteron glabriolum (Bates, 1872)

= Asynapteron glabriolum =

Species of beetle

Asynapteron glabriolum is a species of beetle in the family Cerambycidae. It was described by Henry Walter Bates in 1872.
