= Psiloibidion leucogramma =

Scientific classification
- Kingdom: Animalia
- Phylum: Arthropoda
- Class: Insecta
- Order: Coleoptera
- Suborder: Polyphaga
- Infraorder: Cucujiformia
- Family: Cerambycidae
- Genus: Psiloibidion
- Species: P. leucogramma

Binomial name
- Psiloibidion leucogramma Martins, 1968

Species of beetle

Psiloibidion leucogramma is a species of beetle in the family Cerambycidae. It was described by Martins in 1968.
