= Epacroplon =

Scientific classification
- Kingdom: Animalia
- Phylum: Arthropoda
- Class: Insecta
- Order: Coleoptera
- Suborder: Polyphaga
- Infraorder: Cucujiformia
- Family: Cerambycidae
- Subfamily: Cerambycinae
- Tribe: Ibidionini
- Genus: Epacroplon; Martins, 1967

Genus of beetles

Epacroplon is a genus of beetles in the family Cerambycidae, containing the following species:

- Epacroplon armatipes (Martins, 1962)
- Epacroplon cruciatum (Aurivillius, 1899)
