= Engyum virgulatum =

Scientific classification
- Kingdom: Animalia
- Phylum: Arthropoda
- Class: Insecta
- Order: Coleoptera
- Suborder: Polyphaga
- Infraorder: Cucujiformia
- Family: Cerambycidae
- Genus: Engyum
- Species: E. virgulatum

Binomial name
- Engyum virgulatum (Bates, 1880)

Species of beetle

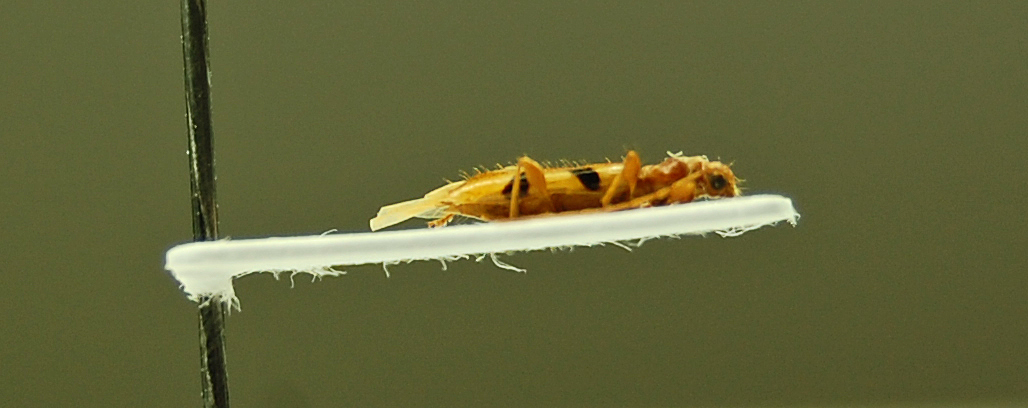

Engyum virgulatum is a species of beetle in the family Cerambycidae. It was described by Bates in 1880.
