= Ophtalmoplon nigricorne =

Scientific classification
- Kingdom: Animalia
- Phylum: Arthropoda
- Class: Insecta
- Order: Coleoptera
- Suborder: Polyphaga
- Infraorder: Cucujiformia
- Family: Cerambycidae
- Genus: Ophtalmoplon
- Species: O. nigricorne

Binomial name
- Ophtalmoplon nigricorne Martins, 1985

Species of beetle

Ophtalmoplon nigricorne is a species of beetle in the family Cerambycidae. It was described by Martins in 1985.
