= Ophtalmoplon aurivillii =

Scientific classification
- Domain: Eukaryota
- Kingdom: Animalia
- Phylum: Arthropoda
- Class: Insecta
- Order: Coleoptera
- Suborder: Polyphaga
- Infraorder: Cucujiformia
- Family: Cerambycidae
- Genus: Ophtalmoplon
- Species: O. aurivillii

Binomial name
- Ophtalmoplon aurivillii Martins, 1965

Synonyms
- Ophalmoplon aurivillii (Martins, 1965)

Species of beetle

Ophtalmoplon aurivillii is a species of beetle in the family Cerambycidae. It was described by Martins in 1965.
