= Aneuthetochorus simplex =

Scientific classification
- Kingdom: Animalia
- Phylum: Arthropoda
- Class: Insecta
- Order: Coleoptera
- Suborder: Polyphaga
- Infraorder: Cucujiformia
- Family: Cerambycidae
- Genus: Aneuthetochorus
- Species: A. simplex

Binomial name
- Aneuthetochorus simplex Martins, 1970

Species of beetle

Aneuthetochorus simplex is a species of beetle in the Cerambycidae family. It was described by Martins in 1970.
