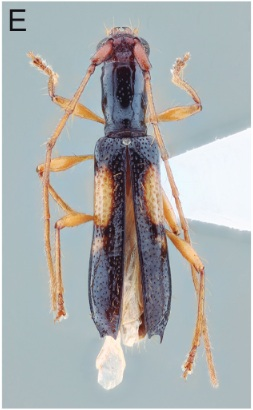

Scientific classification
- Kingdom: Animalia
- Phylum: Arthropoda
- Clade: Pancrustacea
- Class: Insecta
- Order: Coleoptera
- Suborder: Polyphaga
- Infraorder: Cucujiformia
- Family: Cerambycidae
- Genus: Neognomidolon
- Species: N. pereirai

Binomial name
- Neognomidolon pereirai (Martins, 1960)

Synonyms
- Gnomidolon pereirai Martins, 1960

= Neognomidolon pereirai =

Species of beetle

Neognomidolon pereirai is a species of beetle in the family Cerambycidae. It was described by Martins in 1960. It is found in Brazil.
