= Cycnidolon immaculatum =

Scientific classification
- Kingdom: Animalia
- Phylum: Arthropoda
- Clade: Pancrustacea
- Class: Insecta
- Order: Coleoptera
- Suborder: Polyphaga
- Infraorder: Cucujiformia
- Family: Cerambycidae
- Genus: Cycnidolon
- Species: C. immaculatum

Binomial name
- Cycnidolon immaculatum Galileo & Martins, 2004

Species of beetle

Cycnidolon immaculatum is a species of beetle in the family Cerambycidae. It was described by Galileo and Martins in 2004.
