= Ophtalmibidion oculatum =

Scientific classification
- Domain: Eukaryota
- Kingdom: Animalia
- Phylum: Arthropoda
- Class: Insecta
- Order: Coleoptera
- Suborder: Polyphaga
- Infraorder: Cucujiformia
- Family: Cerambycidae
- Genus: Ophtalmibidion
- Species: O. oculatum

Binomial name
- Ophtalmibidion oculatum Martins, 1969

Species of beetle

Ophtalmibidion oculatum is a species of beetle in the family Cerambycidae. It was described by Martins in 1969.
