= Paracompsa =

Scientific classification
- Kingdom: Animalia
- Phylum: Arthropoda
- Class: Insecta
- Order: Coleoptera
- Suborder: Polyphaga
- Infraorder: Cucujiformia
- Family: Cerambycidae
- Tribe: Ibidionini
- Genus: Paracompsa

Genus of beetles

Paracompsa is a genus of beetles in the family Cerambycidae, containing the following species:

- Paracompsa flavofasciata (Thomson, 1867)
- Paracompsa latifascia (Martins, 1970)
