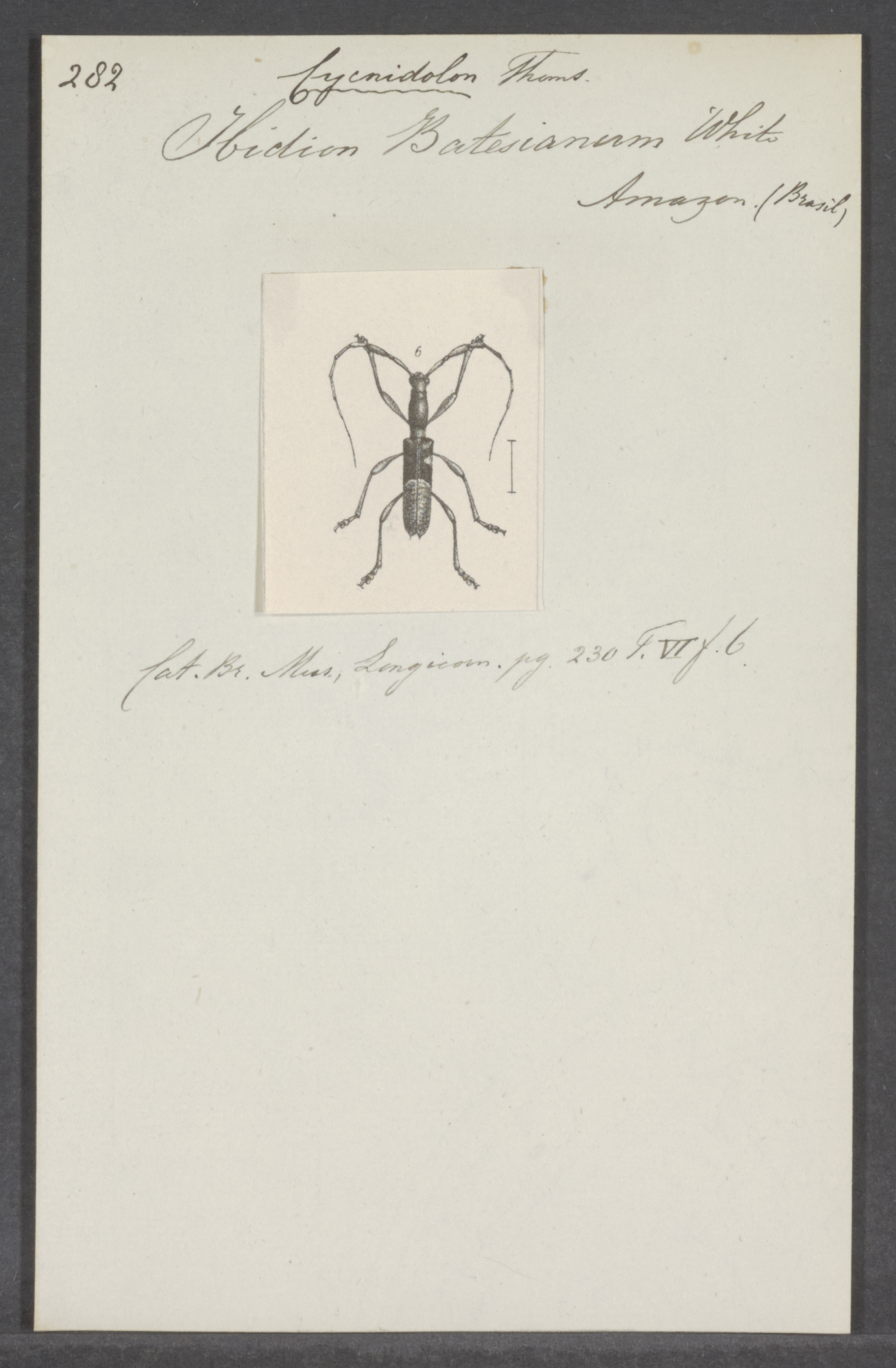
- Cycnidolon from Iconographia Zoologica

Scientific classification
- Domain: Eukaryota
- Kingdom: Animalia
- Phylum: Arthropoda
- Class: Insecta
- Order: Coleoptera
- Suborder: Polyphaga
- Infraorder: Cucujiformia
- Family: Cerambycidae
- Subfamily: Cerambycinae
- Tribe: Ibidionini
- Genus: Cycnidolon; Thomson, 1864

= Cycnidolon =

Genus of beetles

Cycnidolon is a genus of beetles in the family Cerambycidae, containing the following species:

- Cycnidolon apicale Martins & Galileo, 2007
- Cycnidolon approximatum (White, 1855)
- Cycnidolon batesianum (White, 1855)
- Cycnidolon bimaculatum Martins, 1960
- Cycnidolon binodosum Bates, 1870
- Cycnidolon bruchi Napp & Martins, 1985
- Cycnidolon caracense Martins, 1964
- Cycnidolon clarkei Martins & Galileo, 2007
- Cycnidolon eques Thomson, 1864
- Cycnidolon gounellei Bruch, 1908
- Cycnidolon immaculatum Galileo & Martins, 2004
- Cycnidolon minutum Martins, 1960
- Cycnidolon obliquum Martins, 1969
- Cycnidolon phormesioides Martins, 1960
- Cycnidolon podicale (Thomson, 1867)
- Cycnidolon pulchellum (Lameere, 1893)
- Cycnidolon pumillum Napp & Martins, 1985
- Cycnidolon sericeum Martins, 1960
- Cycnidolon spinosum Napp & Martins, 1985
- Cycnidolon trituberculatum Martins, 1969
