= Psiloibidion =

Scientific classification
- Kingdom: Animalia
- Phylum: Arthropoda
- Class: Insecta
- Order: Coleoptera
- Suborder: Polyphaga
- Infraorder: Cucujiformia
- Family: Cerambycidae
- Tribe: Ibidionini
- Genus: Psiloibidion; Martins, 1968

Genus of beetles

Psiloibidion is a genus of beetles in the family Cerambycidae, containing the following species:

- Psiloibidion boteroi Garcia, 2019
- Psiloibidion leucogramma (Perty, 1832)
