= Glyptoceridion =

Glyptoceridion quincunx

Scientific classification
- Kingdom: Animalia
- Phylum: Arthropoda
- Class: Insecta
- Order: Coleoptera
- Suborder: Polyphaga
- Infraorder: Cucujiformia
- Family: Cerambycidae
- Genus: Glyptoceridion
- Species: G. quincunx

Binomial name
- Glyptoceridion quincunx (Thomson, 1867)

Genus of beetles

Glyptoceridion quincunx is a species of beetle in the family Cerambycidae, the only species in the genus Glyptoceridion.
