= Engyum =

Scientific classification
- Kingdom: Animalia
- Phylum: Arthropoda
- Class: Insecta
- Order: Coleoptera
- Suborder: Polyphaga
- Infraorder: Cucujiformia
- Family: Cerambycidae
- Tribe: Ibidionini
- Genus: Engyum

Genus of beetles

Engyum is a genus of beetles in the family Cerambycidae, containing the following species:

- Engyum aurantium Martins, 1970
- Engyum carinatum Martins, 1970
- Engyum crassum Martins, 1970
- Engyum euchare (Martins, 1960)
- Engyum fasciatum Martins, 2009
- Engyum fusiferum (Audinet-Serville, 1834)
- Engyum howdeni Martins & Napp, 1986
- Engyum linsleyi Martins, 1970
- Engyum ludibriosum Martins, 1970
- Engyum melanodacrys (White, 1855)
- Engyum oculare Martins, 2009
- Engyum quadrinotatum Thomson, 1864
- Engyum transversum Martins, 1970
- Engyum virgulatum (Bates, 1880)
- Engyum zonarium Martins & Napp, 1986
