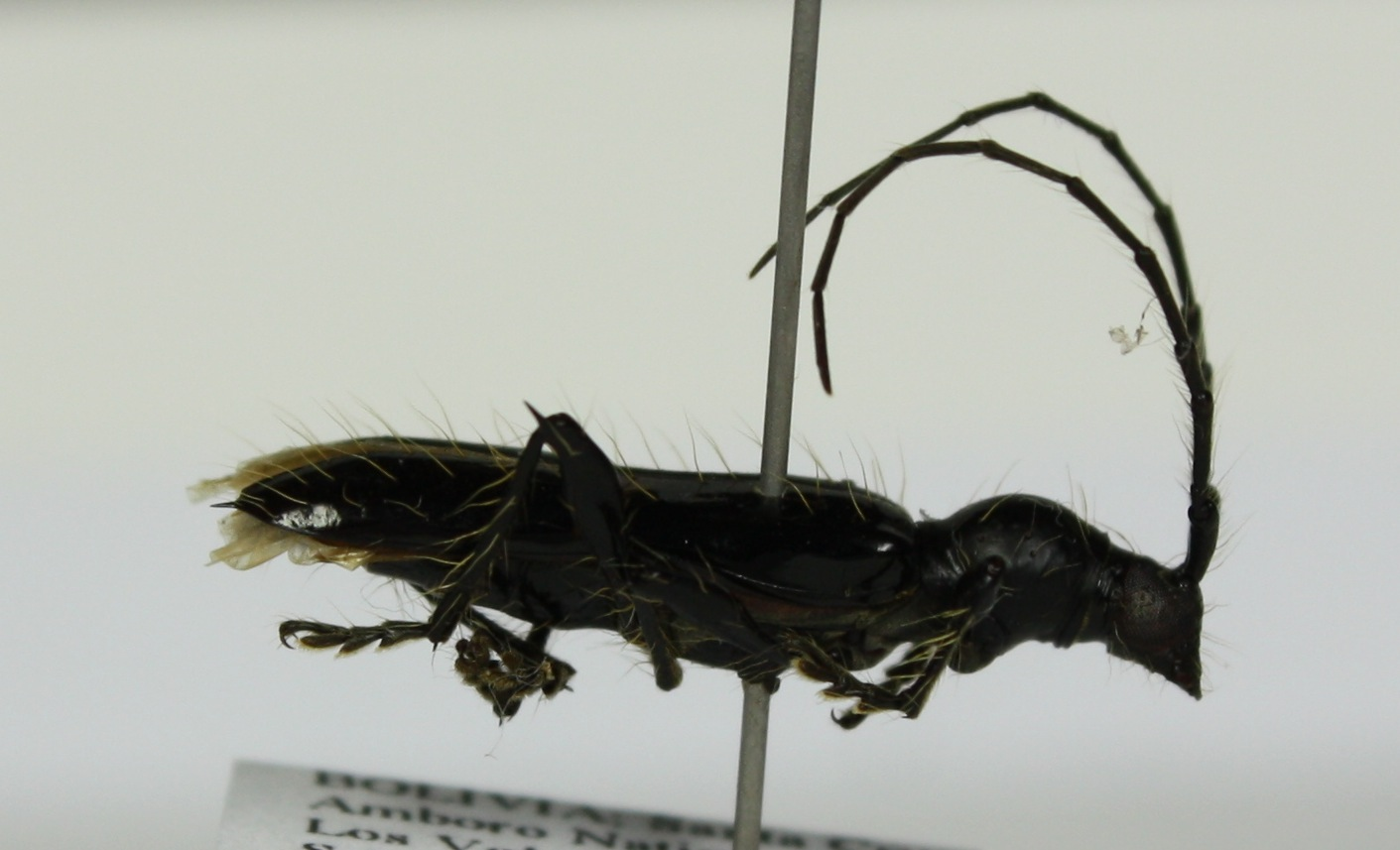
- Isostenygra monnei

Scientific classification
- Kingdom: Animalia
- Phylum: Arthropoda
- Class: Insecta
- Order: Coleoptera
- Suborder: Polyphaga
- Infraorder: Cucujiformia
- Family: Cerambycidae
- Genus: Isostenygra
- Species: I. monnei

Binomial name
- Isostenygra monnei Martins & Galileo, 1999

= Isostenygra =

Isostenygra monnei

Genus of beetles

Isostenygra monnei is a species of beetle in the family Cerambycidae, the only species in the genus Isostenygra.
