= Megaceron =

Scientific classification
- Kingdom: Animalia
- Phylum: Arthropoda
- Class: Insecta
- Order: Coleoptera
- Suborder: Polyphaga
- Infraorder: Cucujiformia
- Family: Cerambycidae
- Tribe: Ibidionini
- Genus: Megaceron

Genus of beetles

Megaceron is a genus of beetles in the family Cerambycidae, containing the following species:

- Megaceron antennicrassum (Martins, 1960)
- Megaceron australe (Martins, 1960)
