= Neotropidion =

Scientific classification
- Kingdom: Animalia
- Phylum: Arthropoda
- Class: Insecta
- Order: Coleoptera
- Suborder: Polyphaga
- Infraorder: Cucujiformia
- Family: Cerambycidae
- Tribe: Ibidionini
- Genus: Neotropidion

Genus of beetles

Neotropidion is a genus of beetles in the family Cerambycidae, containing the following species:

- Neotropidion nodicolle (Dalman, 1823)
- Neotropidion pulchellum Martins, 1968
