= Corimbion =

Scientific classification
- Kingdom: Animalia
- Phylum: Arthropoda
- Class: Insecta
- Order: Coleoptera
- Suborder: Polyphaga
- Infraorder: Cucujiformia
- Family: Cerambycidae
- Tribe: Ibidionini
- Genus: Corimbion; Martins, 1970

Genus of beetles

Corimbion is a genus of beetles in the family Cerambycidae, containing the following species:

- Corimbion antennatum Martins & Galileo, 2014
- Corimbion balteum Martins, 1970
- Corimbion caliginosum Martins, 1970
- Corimbion kuckartzi Santos-Silva, Galileo & Wappes, 2015
- Corimbion ledezmae Santos-Silva, Galileo & Wappes, 2015
- Corimbion martinsi Giesbert, 1998
- Corimbion mutabile Bezark, Santos-Silva & Galileo, 2016
- Corimbion nigroapicatum Martins, 1970
- Corimbion supremum Martins, 1970
- Corimbion terminatum Martins, 1970
- Corimbion vulgare Martins, 1970
