= Megaceron antennicrassum =

Scientific classification
- Kingdom: Animalia
- Phylum: Arthropoda
- Class: Insecta
- Order: Coleoptera
- Suborder: Polyphaga
- Infraorder: Cucujiformia
- Family: Cerambycidae
- Genus: Megaceron
- Species: M. antennicrassum

Binomial name
- Megaceron antennicrassum (Martins, 1960)

Species of beetle

Megaceron antennicrassum is a species of beetle in the family Cerambycidae. It was described by Martins in 1960.
