= Aneuthetochorus =

Scientific classification
- Kingdom: Animalia
- Phylum: Arthropoda
- Class: Insecta
- Order: Coleoptera
- Suborder: Polyphaga
- Infraorder: Cucujiformia
- Family: Cerambycidae
- Tribe: Ibidionini
- Genus: Aneuthetochorus

Genus of beetles

Aneuthetochorus is a genus of beetles in the family Cerambycidae, containing the following species:

- Aneuthetochorus bivestitus (Martins, 1962)
- Aneuthetochorus conjunctus Napp & Martins, 1984
- Aneuthetochorus punctatus Martins, Galileo & de-Oliveira, 2009
- Aneuthetochorus simplex Martins, 1970
