= Sydax =

Scientific classification
- Kingdom: Animalia
- Phylum: Arthropoda
- Class: Insecta
- Order: Coleoptera
- Suborder: Polyphaga
- Infraorder: Cucujiformia
- Family: Cerambycidae
- Tribe: Ibidionini
- Genus: Sydax

Genus of beetles

Sydax is a genus of beetles in the family Cerambycidae, containing the following species:

- Sydax amazonicus Martins, 1971
- Sydax confragus Martins, 1971
- Sydax gibbus Joly, 1985
- Sydax inexpectatus Martins, 1981
- Sydax stramineus Lacordaire, 1869
