= Rhysium =

Scientific classification
- Kingdom: Animalia
- Phylum: Arthropoda
- Class: Insecta
- Order: Coleoptera
- Suborder: Polyphaga
- Infraorder: Cucujiformia
- Family: Cerambycidae
- Tribe: Ibidionini
- Genus: Rhysium; Pascoe, 1866

Genus of beetles

Rhysium is a genus of beetles in the family Cerambycidae, containing the following species:

- Rhysium bimaculatum Pascoe, 1866
- Rhysium bivulneratum (Thomson, 1867)
- Rhysium guttiferum (Thomson, 1867)
- Rhysium spilotum Martins & Galileo, 2007
