= Phocibidion =

Scientific classification
- Kingdom: Animalia
- Phylum: Arthropoda
- Class: Insecta
- Order: Coleoptera
- Suborder: Polyphaga
- Infraorder: Cucujiformia
- Family: Cerambycidae
- Tribe: Ibidionini
- Genus: Phocibidion

Genus of beetles

Phocibidion is a genus of beetles in the family Cerambycidae, containing the following species:

- Phocibidion erythrocephalum (White, 1855)
- Phocibidion pulcherrimum (Martins, 1962)
