= Heterocompsa =

Scientific classification
- Kingdom: Animalia
- Phylum: Arthropoda
- Class: Insecta
- Order: Coleoptera
- Suborder: Polyphaga
- Infraorder: Cucujiformia
- Family: Cerambycidae
- Tribe: Ibidionini
- Genus: Heterocompsa

Genus of beetles

Heterocompsa is a genus of beetles in the family Cerambycidae, containing the following species:

- Heterocompsa aquilonia Giesbert, 1998
- Heterocompsa eburata Martins, 1970
- Heterocompsa formosa (Martins, 1962)
- Heterocompsa geniculata (Thomson, 1865)
- Heterocompsa nigripes (Martins, 1962)
- Heterocompsa seabrai (Martins, 1962)
- Heterocompsa stellae (Martins, 1962)
- Heterocompsa truncaticornis (Martins, 1960)
