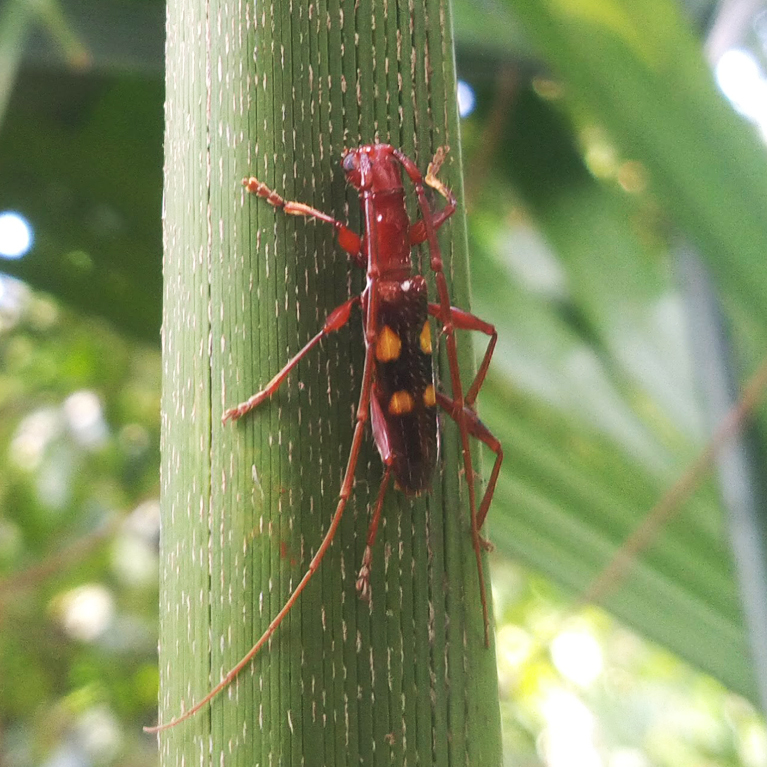
- Asynapteron glabriolum

Scientific classification
- Domain: Eukaryota
- Kingdom: Animalia
- Phylum: Arthropoda
- Class: Insecta
- Order: Coleoptera
- Suborder: Polyphaga
- Infraorder: Cucujiformia
- Family: Cerambycidae
- Subfamily: Cerambycinae
- Tribe: Ibidionini
- Genus: Asynapteron; Martins, 1970

= Asynapteron =

Genus of beetles

Asynapteron is a genus of beetles in the family Cerambycidae, containing the following species:

- Asynapteron contrarium Martins, 1971
- Asynapteron eburnigerum (Aurivillius, 1899)
- Asynapteron equatorianum (Martins, 1960)
- Asynapteron glabriolum (Bates, 1872)
- Asynapteron inca (Martins, 1962)
- Asynapteron ranthum Martins, 1970
