= Coleroidion =

Scientific classification
- Kingdom: Animalia
- Phylum: Arthropoda
- Class: Insecta
- Order: Coleoptera
- Suborder: Polyphaga
- Infraorder: Cucujiformia
- Family: Cerambycidae
- Tribe: Ibidionini
- Genus: Coleroidion

Genus of beetles

Coleroidion is a genus of beetles in the family Cerambycidae, containing the following species:

- Coleroidion cingulum Martins, 1969
- Coleroidion leucotrichum (Martins, 1960)
