= Alcyopis =

Scientific classification
- Domain: Eukaryota
- Kingdom: Animalia
- Phylum: Arthropoda
- Class: Insecta
- Order: Coleoptera
- Suborder: Polyphaga
- Infraorder: Cucujiformia
- Family: Cerambycidae
- Tribe: Ibidionini
- Genus: Alcyopis

Genus of beetles

Alcyopis is a genus of beetles in the family Cerambycidae, containing the following species:

- Alcyopis chalcea Bates, 1874
- Alcyopis cyanoptera Pascoe, 1866
- Alcyopis nigromaculata Aurivillius, 1927
- Alcyopis nigrovittata Gounelle, 1909
