= Perissomerus =

Scientific classification
- Kingdom: Animalia
- Phylum: Arthropoda
- Class: Insecta
- Order: Coleoptera
- Suborder: Polyphaga
- Infraorder: Cucujiformia
- Family: Cerambycidae
- Tribe: Ibidionini
- Genus: Perissomerus; Gounelle, 1909

Genus of beetles

Perissomerus is a genus of beetles in the family Cerambycidae, containing the following species:

- Perissomerus alvarengai Martins, 1961
- Perissomerus dasytes Martins, 1968
- Perissomerus flammeus Martins, 1971
- Perissomerus hilairei Gounelle, 1909
- Perissomerus machadoi Martins, Galileo & Santos-Silva, 2016
- Perissomerus rubrus Martins & Galileo, 2007
- Perissomerus ruficollis Martins, 1961
