= Megapedion =

Scientific classification
- Kingdom: Animalia
- Phylum: Arthropoda
- Class: Insecta
- Order: Coleoptera
- Suborder: Polyphaga
- Infraorder: Cucujiformia
- Family: Cerambycidae
- Tribe: Ibidionini
- Genus: Megapedion

Genus of beetles

Megapedion is a genus of beetles in the family Cerambycidae, containing the following species:

- Megapedion lefebvrei (Gounelle, 1909)
- Megapedion sylphis (Bates, 1870)
