= Hadroibidion =

Scientific classification
- Domain: Eukaryota
- Kingdom: Animalia
- Phylum: Arthropoda
- Class: Insecta
- Order: Coleoptera
- Suborder: Polyphaga
- Infraorder: Cucujiformia
- Family: Cerambycidae
- Tribe: Ibidionini
- Genus: Hadroibidion

Genus of beetles

Hadroibidion is a genus of beetles in the family Cerambycidae, containing the following species:

- Hadroibidion nanum (Gounelle, 1911)
- Hadroibidion pullum (Martins, 1962)
- Hadroibidion vulgare Martins & Napp, 1986
