= Ibidion =

Scientific classification
- Domain: Eukaryota
- Kingdom: Animalia
- Phylum: Arthropoda
- Class: Insecta
- Order: Coleoptera
- Suborder: Polyphaga
- Infraorder: Cucujiformia
- Family: Cerambycidae
- Subfamily: Cerambycinae
- Tribe: Ibidionini
- Genus: Ibidion; Audinet-Serville, 1834
- Species: I. comatum

Binomial name
- Ibidion comatum Audinet-Serville, 1834

Synonyms
- Neoibidion Monné, 2012 (unjustified replacement name); Brydacon Thomson, 1867; Neoibidion comatum (Audinet-Serville, 1834)

Genus of beetles

Ibidion is the type genus of longhorn beetles in the tribe Ibidionini.

This is a monotypic genus with Ibidion comatum (a.k.a. Neoibidion comatum) the only species.
