= Tetraopidion =

Scientific classification
- Kingdom: Animalia
- Phylum: Arthropoda
- Class: Insecta
- Order: Coleoptera
- Suborder: Polyphaga
- Infraorder: Cucujiformia
- Family: Cerambycidae
- Tribe: Ibidionini
- Genus: Tetraopidion; Martins, 1960

Genus of beetles

Tetraopidion is a genus of beetles in the family Cerambycidae, containing the following species:

- Tetraopidion geminatum Martins, 1969
- Tetraopidion mucoriferum (Thomson, 1867)
- Tetraopidion tetraophtalmum Martins, 1960
- Tetraopidion venezuelanum Martins, 1960
