= Ctenoplon =

Ctenoplon x-littera

Scientific classification
- Kingdom: Animalia
- Phylum: Arthropoda
- Clade: Pancrustacea
- Class: Insecta
- Order: Coleoptera
- Suborder: Polyphaga
- Infraorder: Cucujiformia
- Family: Cerambycidae
- Genus: Ctenoplon
- Species: C. x-littera

Binomial name
- Ctenoplon x-littera (Thomson, 1865)

Genus of beetles

Ctenoplon x-littera is a species of beetle in the family Cerambycidae, the only species in the genus Ctenoplon. It is found in Brazil (Maranhão, Goiás, Pernambuco, Bahia, Minas Gerais, Espírito Santo, Rio de Janeiro, São Paulo, Paraná, Santa Catarina, Rio Grande do Sul), Bolivia (Santa Cruz), Paraguay and Argentina (Formosa, Misiones)
