= Hormathus =

Scientific classification
- Kingdom: Animalia
- Phylum: Arthropoda
- Class: Insecta
- Order: Coleoptera
- Suborder: Polyphaga
- Infraorder: Cucujiformia
- Family: Cerambycidae
- Tribe: Ibidionini
- Genus: Hormathus

Genus of beetles

Hormathus is a genus of beetles in the family Cerambycidae, containing the following species:

- Hormathus bicolor Zayas, 1975
- Hormathus cinctellus Gahan, 1890
- Hormathus giesberti Lingafelter & Nearns, 2007
