= Opacibidion =

Scientific classification
- Kingdom: Animalia
- Phylum: Arthropoda
- Class: Insecta
- Order: Coleoptera
- Suborder: Polyphaga
- Infraorder: Cucujiformia
- Family: Cerambycidae
- Tribe: Ibidionini
- Genus: Opacibidion

Genus of beetles

Opacibidion is a genus of beetles in the family Cerambycidae, containing the following species:

- Opacibidion opacicolle (Melzer, 1931)
- Opacibidion rugicolle (Nonfried, 1895)
- Opacibidion sulcicorne (White, 1855)
