= Ophtalmibidion =

Scientific classification
- Domain: Eukaryota
- Kingdom: Animalia
- Phylum: Arthropoda
- Class: Insecta
- Order: Coleoptera
- Suborder: Polyphaga
- Infraorder: Cucujiformia
- Family: Cerambycidae
- Subfamily: Cerambycinae
- Tribe: Ibidionini
- Genus: Ophtalmibidion; Martins, 1969

Genus of beetles

Ophtalmibidion is a genus of beetles in the family Cerambycidae, containing the following species:

- Ophtalmibidion antonkozlovi Santos-Silva, Nascimento & Drumont, 2019
- Ophtalmibidion auba Martins & Galileo, 1999
- Ophtalmibidion gutta Vlasak & Santos-Silva, 2022
- Ophtalmibidion luscum Martins, 1971
- Ophtalmibidion oculatum Martins, 1969
- Ophtalmibidion tetrops (Bates, 1870)
