= Stenoidion =

Scientific classification
- Kingdom: Animalia
- Phylum: Arthropoda
- Class: Insecta
- Order: Coleoptera
- Suborder: Polyphaga
- Infraorder: Cucujiformia
- Family: Cerambycidae
- Tribe: Ibidionini
- Genus: Stenoidion; Martins, 1970

Genus of beetles

Stenoidion is a genus of beetles in the family Cerambycidae, containing the following species:

- Stenoidion amphigyum Martins, 1970
- Stenoidion apicatum (Martins, 1962)
- Stenoidion corallinum (Bates, 1870)
- Stenoidion schmidi Martins & Galileo, 2009
