= Prothoracibidion =

Scientific classification
- Kingdom: Animalia
- Phylum: Arthropoda
- Class: Insecta
- Order: Coleoptera
- Suborder: Polyphaga
- Infraorder: Cucujiformia
- Family: Cerambycidae
- Tribe: Ibidionini
- Genus: Prothoracibidion

Genus of beetles

Prothoracibidion is a genus of beetles in the family Cerambycidae, containing the following species:

- Prothoracibidion flavozonatum Martins, 1960
- Prothoracibidion plicatithorax Martins, 1960
- Prothoracibidion xanthopterum Martins, 1962
