= Hexocycnidolon =

Hexocycnidolon unoculum

Scientific classification
- Kingdom: Animalia
- Phylum: Arthropoda
- Class: Insecta
- Order: Coleoptera
- Suborder: Polyphaga
- Infraorder: Cucujiformia
- Family: Cerambycidae
- Genus: Hexocycnidolon
- Species: H. unoculum

Binomial name
- Hexocycnidolon unoculum (Bates, 1870)

Genus of beetles

Hexocycnidolon unoculum is a species of beetle in the family Cerambycidae, the only species in the genus Hexocycnidolon.
