= Tetroplon =

Tetroplon caudatum

Scientific classification
- Kingdom: Animalia
- Phylum: Arthropoda
- Class: Insecta
- Order: Coleoptera
- Suborder: Polyphaga
- Infraorder: Cucujiformia
- Family: Cerambycidae
- Genus: Tetroplon
- Species: T. caudatum

Binomial name
- Tetroplon caudatum Aurivillius, 1899

Genus of beetles

Tetroplon caudatum is a species of beetle in the family Cerambycidae, the only species in the genus Tetroplon.
