= Pronoplon =

Pronoplon rubriceps

Scientific classification
- Kingdom: Animalia
- Phylum: Arthropoda
- Class: Insecta
- Order: Coleoptera
- Suborder: Polyphaga
- Infraorder: Cucujiformia
- Family: Cerambycidae
- Genus: Pronoplon
- Species: P. rubriceps

Binomial name
- Pronoplon rubriceps (Gounelle, 1909)

Genus of beetles

Pronoplon rubriceps is a species of beetle in the family Cerambycidae, the only species in the genus Pronoplon.
