= Dodecaibidion =

Scientific classification
- Kingdom: Animalia
- Phylum: Arthropoda
- Class: Insecta
- Order: Coleoptera
- Suborder: Polyphaga
- Infraorder: Cucujiformia
- Family: Cerambycidae
- Tribe: Ibidionini
- Genus: Dodecaibidion; Martins, 1962

Genus of beetles

Dodecaibidion is a genus of beetles in the family Cerambycidae, containing the following species:

- Dodecaibidion bolivianum Martins & Galileo, 2012
- Dodecaibidion brasiliense Martins, 1962
- Dodecaibidion modestum Martins, 1970
- Dodecaibidion ornatipenne Martins, 1970
