= Uirassu =

Scientific classification
- Kingdom: Animalia
- Phylum: Arthropoda
- Class: Insecta
- Order: Coleoptera
- Suborder: Polyphaga
- Infraorder: Cucujiformia
- Family: Cerambycidae
- Genus: Uirassu
- Species: U. beckeri

Binomial name
- Uirassu beckeri Martins & Galileo, 2010

Genus of beetles

Uirassu beckeri is a species of beetle in the family Cerambycidae, the only species in the genus Uirassu.
