= Brechmoidion =

Scientific classification
- Kingdom: Animalia
- Phylum: Arthropoda
- Class: Insecta
- Order: Coleoptera
- Suborder: Polyphaga
- Infraorder: Cucujiformia
- Family: Cerambycidae
- Tribe: Ibidionini
- Genus: Brechmoidion

Genus of beetles

Brechmoidion is a genus of beetles in the family Cerambycidae, containing the following species:

- Brechmoidion exicisifrons (Martins, 1960)
- Brechmoidion falcatum Napp & Martins, 1985
- Brechmoidion separatum Martins & Galileo, 2007
