= Bomaribidion =

Scientific classification
- Kingdom: Animalia
- Phylum: Arthropoda
- Class: Insecta
- Order: Coleoptera
- Suborder: Polyphaga
- Infraorder: Cucujiformia
- Family: Cerambycidae
- Tribe: Ibidionini
- Genus: Bomaribidion

Genus of beetles

Bomaribidion is a genus of beetles in the family Cerambycidae, containing the following species:

- Bomaribidion angusticolle (Gounelle, 1909)
- Bomaribidion hirsutum Martins, 1969
