= Neopotiatuca =

Neopotiatuca brevis

Scientific classification
- Kingdom: Animalia
- Phylum: Arthropoda
- Class: Insecta
- Order: Coleoptera
- Suborder: Polyphaga
- Infraorder: Cucujiformia
- Family: Cerambycidae
- Genus: Neopotiatuca
- Species: N. brevis

Binomial name
- Neopotiatuca brevis (Martins & Galileo, 2007)

Genus of beetles

Neopotiatuca brevis is a species of beetle in the family Cerambycidae, the only species in the genus Neopotiatuca.
