= Opsibidion =

Scientific classification
- Kingdom: Animalia
- Phylum: Arthropoda
- Class: Insecta
- Order: Coleoptera
- Suborder: Polyphaga
- Infraorder: Cucujiformia
- Family: Cerambycidae
- Genus: Opsibidion

Genus of beetles

Opsibidion is a genus of beetles in the family Cerambycidae, containing the following species:

- Opsibidion albifasciatum Giesbert, 1998
- Opsibidion albinum (Bates, 1870)
- Opsibidion flavocinctum Martins, 1960
