= Neoctoplon =

Neoctoplon brunnipenne

Scientific classification
- Kingdom: Animalia
- Phylum: Arthropoda
- Class: Insecta
- Order: Coleoptera
- Suborder: Polyphaga
- Infraorder: Cucujiformia
- Family: Cerambycidae
- Genus: Neoctoplon
- Species: N. brunnipenne

Binomial name
- Neoctoplon brunnipenne (Martins, 1960)

Genus of beetles

Neoctoplon brunnipenne is a species of beetle in the family Cerambycidae, the only species in the genus Neoctoplon.
