= Smaragdion =

Smaragdion viride

Scientific classification
- Kingdom: Animalia
- Phylum: Arthropoda
- Class: Insecta
- Order: Coleoptera
- Suborder: Polyphaga
- Infraorder: Cucujiformia
- Family: Cerambycidae
- Genus: Smaragdion
- Species: S. viride

Binomial name
- Smaragdion viride Martins, 1968

Genus of beetles

Smaragdion viride is a species of beetle in the family Cerambycidae, the only species in the genus Smaragdion.
