= Homaloidion =

Homaloidion pinacopterum

Scientific classification
- Kingdom: Animalia
- Phylum: Arthropoda
- Class: Insecta
- Order: Coleoptera
- Suborder: Polyphaga
- Infraorder: Cucujiformia
- Family: Cerambycidae
- Genus: Homaloidion
- Species: H. pinacopterum

Binomial name
- Homaloidion pinacopterum (Martins, 1962)

Genus of beetles

Homaloidion pinacopterum is a species of beetle in the family Cerambycidae, the only species in the genus Homaloidion.
