= Palpibidion =

Palpibidion minimum

Scientific classification
- Kingdom: Animalia
- Phylum: Arthropoda
- Class: Insecta
- Order: Coleoptera
- Suborder: Polyphaga
- Infraorder: Cucujiformia
- Family: Cerambycidae
- Genus: Palpibidion
- Species: P. minimum

Binomial name
- Palpibidion minimum Martins & Galileo, 2003

Genus of beetles

Palpibidion minimum is a species of beetle in the family Cerambycidae, the only species in the genus Palpibidion.
