= Cephaloplon =

Cephaloplon pedunculatum

Scientific classification
- Kingdom: Animalia
- Phylum: Arthropoda
- Class: Insecta
- Order: Coleoptera
- Suborder: Polyphaga
- Infraorder: Cucujiformia
- Family: Cerambycidae
- Genus: Cephaloplon
- Species: C. pedunculatum

Binomial name
- Cephaloplon pedunculatum Martins & Napp, 1986

Genus of beetles

Cephaloplon pedunculatum is a species of beetle in the family Cerambycidae, the only species in the genus Cephaloplon.
