= Monzonia =

Monzonia sanmarcosana

Scientific classification
- Kingdom: Animalia
- Phylum: Arthropoda
- Class: Insecta
- Order: Coleoptera
- Suborder: Polyphaga
- Infraorder: Cucujiformia
- Family: Cerambycidae
- Genus: Monzonia
- Species: M. sanmarcosana

Binomial name
- Monzonia sanmarcosana Giesbert, 1998

Genus of beetles

Monzonia sanmarcosana is a species of beetle in the family Cerambycidae, the only species in the genus Monzonia.
