= Pubescibidion =

Pubescibidion pubescens

Scientific classification
- Kingdom: Animalia
- Phylum: Arthropoda
- Class: Insecta
- Order: Coleoptera
- Suborder: Polyphaga
- Infraorder: Cucujiformia
- Family: Cerambycidae
- Genus: Pubescibidion
- Species: P. pubescens

Binomial name
- Pubescibidion pubescens Martins, 2009

Genus of beetles

Pubescibidion pubescens is a species of beetle in the family Cerambycidae, the only species in the genus Pubescibidion.
