= Kolonibidion =

Kolonibidion femoratum

Scientific classification
- Kingdom: Animalia
- Phylum: Arthropoda
- Class: Insecta
- Order: Coleoptera
- Suborder: Polyphaga
- Infraorder: Cucujiformia
- Family: Cerambycidae
- Genus: Kolonibidion
- Species: K. femoratum

Binomial name
- Kolonibidion femoratum (Martins, 1971)

Genus of beetles

Kolonibidion femoratum is a species of beetle in the family Cerambycidae, the only species in the genus Kolonibidion.
