= Diasporidion =

Scientific classification
- Kingdom: Animalia
- Phylum: Arthropoda
- Class: Insecta
- Order: Coleoptera
- Suborder: Polyphaga
- Infraorder: Cucujiformia
- Family: Cerambycidae
- Genus: Diasporidion

Genus of beetles

Diasporidion is a genus of beetles in the family Cerambycidae, containing the following species:

- Diasporidion argentinense (Martins, 1962)
- Diasporidion duplicatum (Gounelle, 1909)
