= Cecaibidion =

Cecaibidion bivittatum

Scientific classification
- Kingdom: Animalia
- Phylum: Arthropoda
- Class: Insecta
- Order: Coleoptera
- Suborder: Polyphaga
- Infraorder: Cucujiformia
- Family: Cerambycidae
- Genus: Cecaibidion
- Species: C. bivittatum

Binomial name
- Cecaibidion bivittatum Galileo & Martins, 2001

Genus of beetles

Cecaibidion bivittatum is a species of beetle in the family Cerambycidae, the only species in the genus Cecaibidion.
