= Glomibidion =

Glomibidion tumidum

Scientific classification
- Kingdom: Animalia
- Phylum: Arthropoda
- Class: Insecta
- Order: Coleoptera
- Suborder: Polyphaga
- Infraorder: Cucujiformia
- Family: Cerambycidae
- Genus: Glomibidion
- Species: G. tumidum

Binomial name
- Glomibidion tumidum Napp & Martins, 1985

Genus of beetles

Glomibidion tumidum is a species of beetle in the family Cerambycidae, the only species in the genus Glomibidion.
