= Kunaibidion =

Kunaibidion panamensis

Scientific classification
- Kingdom: Animalia
- Phylum: Arthropoda
- Class: Insecta
- Order: Coleoptera
- Suborder: Polyphaga
- Infraorder: Cucujiformia
- Family: Cerambycidae
- Genus: Kunaibidion
- Species: K. panamensis

Binomial name
- Kunaibidion panamensis Giesbert, 1998

Genus of beetles

Kunaibidion panamensis is a species of beetle in the family Cerambycidae, the only species in the genus Kunaibidion.
