= Aphatum =

Aphatum rufulum

Scientific classification
- Kingdom: Animalia
- Phylum: Arthropoda
- Class: Insecta
- Order: Coleoptera
- Suborder: Polyphaga
- Infraorder: Cucujiformia
- Family: Cerambycidae
- Genus: Aphatum
- Species: A. rufulum

Binomial name
- Aphatum rufulum (White, 1855)

Genus of beetles in the family Cerambycidae

Aphatum rufulum is a species of beetle in the family Cerambycidae, the only species in the genus Aphatum.
