= Trichoplon =

Trichoplon extremum

Scientific classification
- Kingdom: Animalia
- Phylum: Arthropoda
- Class: Insecta
- Order: Coleoptera
- Suborder: Polyphaga
- Infraorder: Cucujiformia
- Family: Cerambycidae
- Genus: Trichoplon
- Species: T. extremum

Binomial name
- Trichoplon extremum (Martins, 1959)

Genus of beetles

Trichoplon extremum is a species of beetle in the family Cerambycidae, the only species in the genus Trichoplon.
