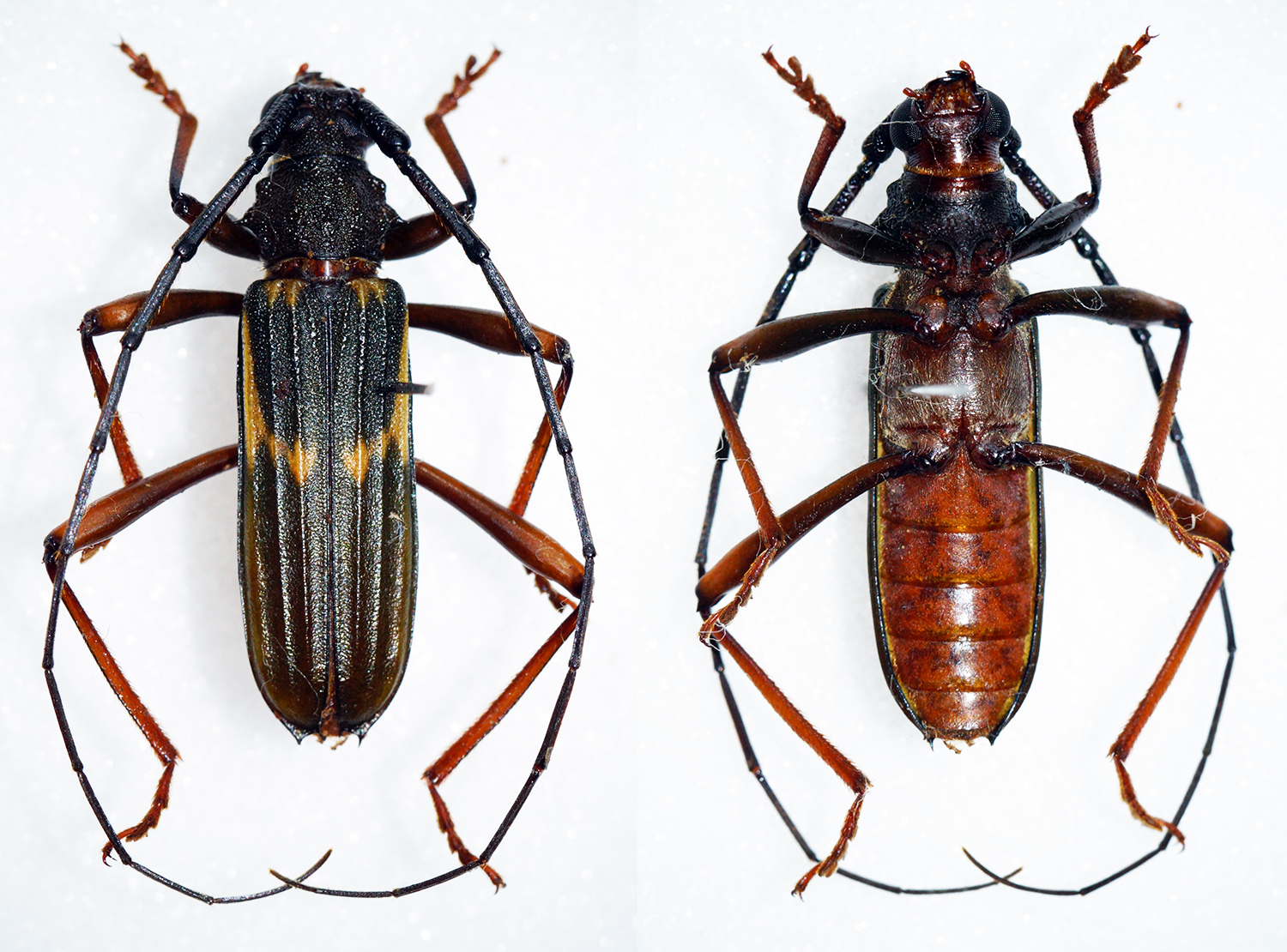
- Chlorida denticulata

Scientific classification
- Kingdom: Animalia
- Phylum: Arthropoda
- Class: Insecta
- Order: Coleoptera
- Suborder: Polyphaga
- Infraorder: Cucujiformia
- Family: Cerambycidae
- Subfamily: Cerambycinae
- Tribe: Bothriospilini; Lane, 1950

Type genus
- Bothriospila Aurivillius, 1923

= Bothriospilini =

Tribe of beetles

Bothriospilini is a tribe of beetles in the subfamily Cerambycinae, containing 11 genera which have a primarily neotropical distribution. The tribe was proposed in 1950 by Brazilian entomologist Frederico Lane as a member of the new subfamily Bothriospilinae, and with Bothriospila assigned as the type genus. The tribe is morphologically close to the tribe Torneutini, with which it has in common the same shape of the last abdominal segment, which is wide and largely braided in the female, as well as the anterior thigh cavities that are open from behind and the laterally open medial cavity.

The compound (6E,8Z)-6,8-pentadecadienal, produced by adult males of Chlorida festiva and Chlorida costata, was the first pheromone identified from species in Bothriospilini. The sex pheromone methionol (3-methylthiopropan-1-ol), as well as the corresponding sulfoxide, 3-methylsulfinylpropan-1-ol, produced by Knulliana cincta, was identified in 2022. In 2005, Monné and Napp transferred the genera Ranqueles and Scapanopygus to the tribe based on cladistic analysis.

== Bothriospila ==
The only species in the genus Bothriospila is Bothriospila elegans. It was described by Aurivillius in 1923.

== Chlorida ==
The genus Chlorida contains the following species:

Image	Species	First described	Range	Synonyms
Image of Chlorida cincta	Chlorida cincta	Guérin-Méneville, 1844	Mexico, Colombia, Ecuador	
	Chlorida costata	Audinet-Serville, 1834	Brazil, Paraguay, Argentina, Uruguay	
	Chlorida curta	Thomson, 1857	French Guiana, northern central Brazil, Ecuador	Chlorida parvula Thomson 1861
Image of Chlorida denticulata	Chlorida denticulata	Buquet, 1860	Guianas	
	Chlorida fasciata	Bates, 1870	North western Brazil, Ecuador	
Image of Chlorida festiva	Chlorida festiva	(Linnaeus, 1758)	South eastern United States, Central America, South America, West Indies	Cerambyx festivus Linnaeus, 1758; Cerambyx spinosus Degeer, 1775 (Preocc.); Cerambyx sulcatus Sulzer, 1776; Cerambyx africanus Voet, 1778 (Unav.)
	Chlorida inexpectata	Martins, Galileo & Oliveira, 2011	Brazil	
	Chlorida obliqua	Buquet, 1852	Colombia	
	Chlorida spinosa	Aurivillius, 1887	Colombia, Bolivia, Ecuador	
	Chlorida transversalis	Buquet in Guérin-Méneville, 1844	Colombia	

== Chrotoma ==
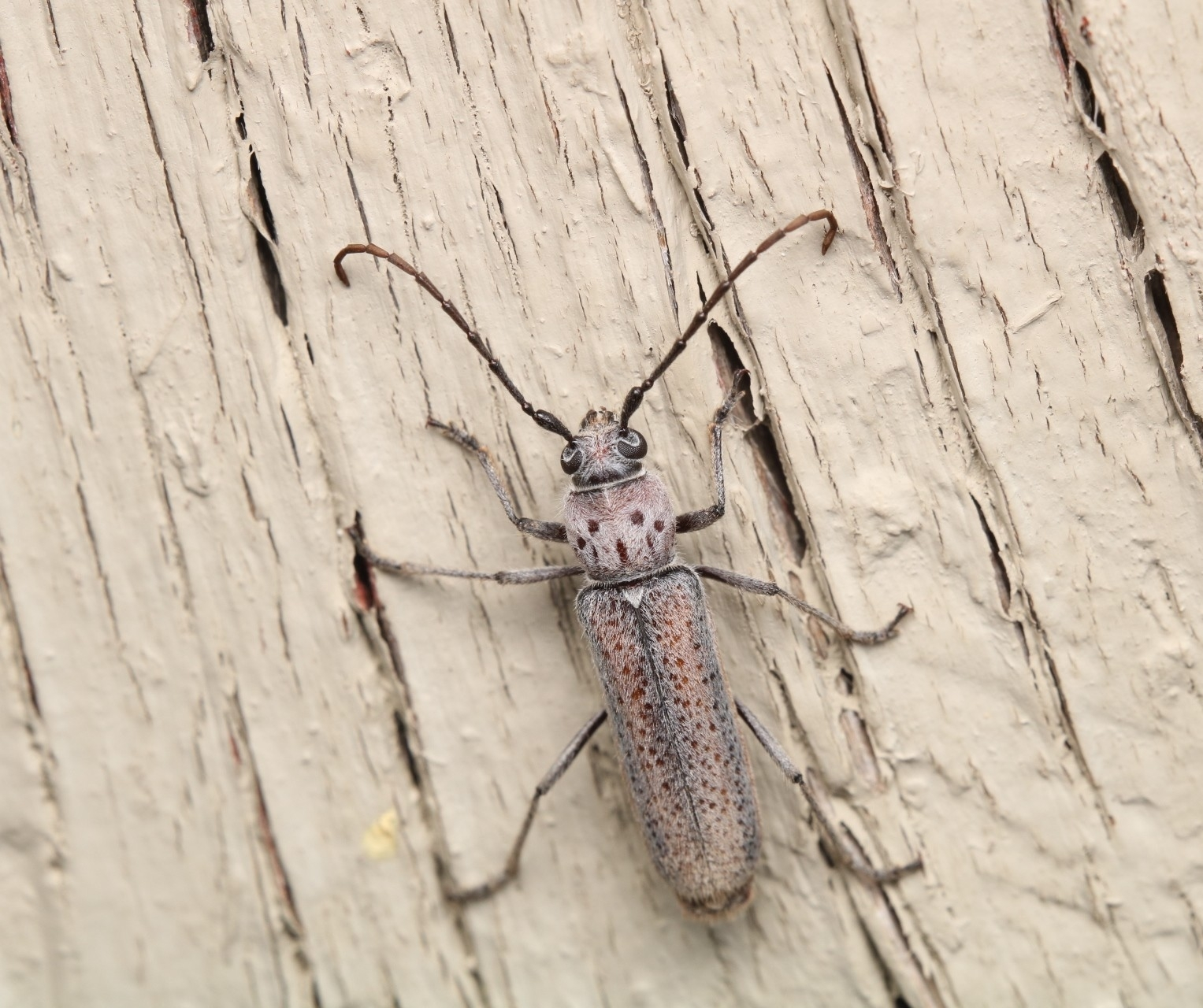
Chrotoma dunniana Casey, 1891

The only species in the genus Chrotoma is Chrotoma dunniana. It was described by Casey in 1891.

== Delemodacrys ==
The only species in the genus Delemodacrys is Delemodacrys mourei. It was described by Martins & Napp in 1979.

== Gnaphalodes ==
The only species in the genus Gnaphalodes is Gnaphalodes trachyderoides. It was described by Thomson in 1860.

== Knulliana ==
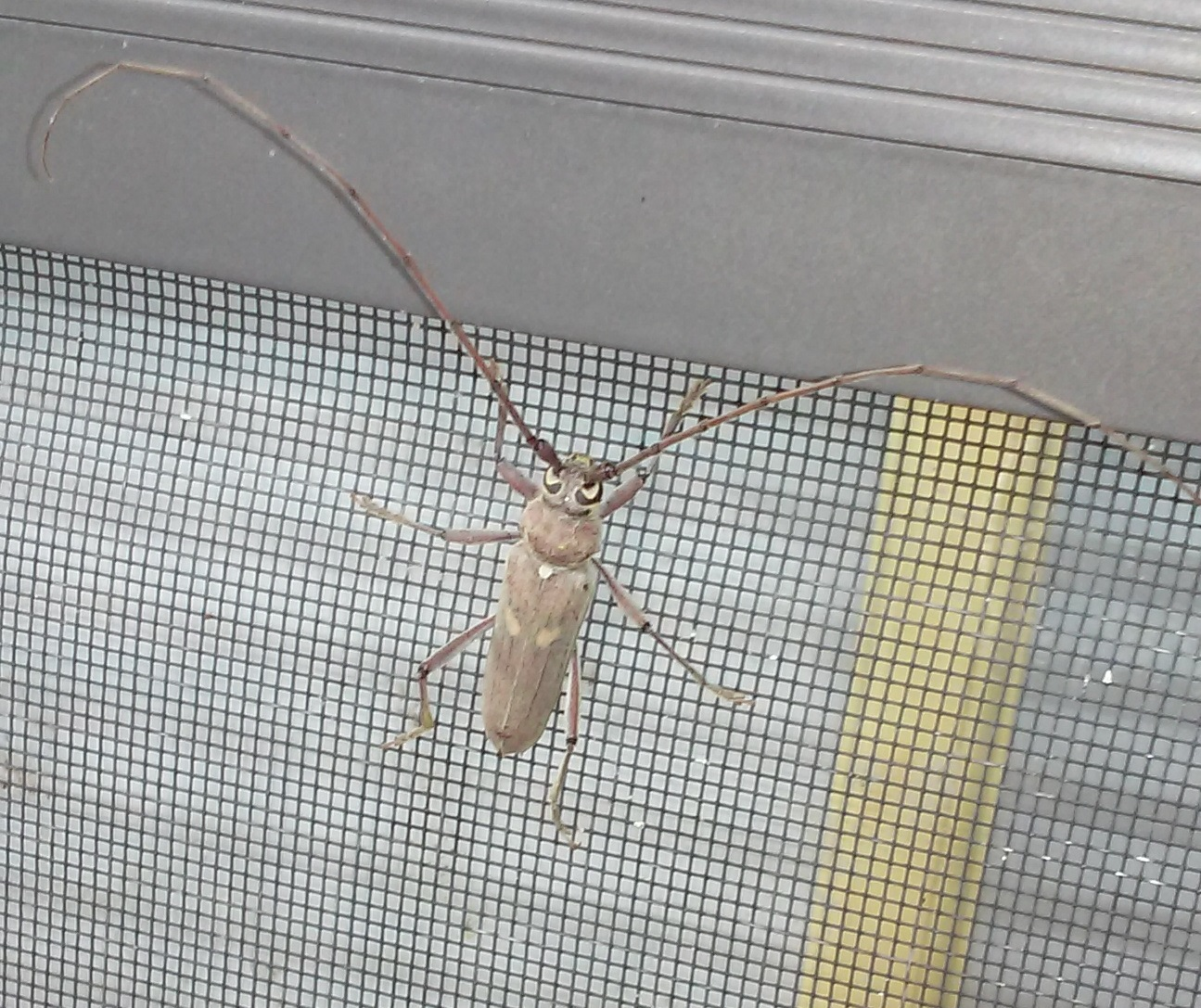
Knulliana cincta (Drury, 1773)

The only species in the genus Knulliana is Knulliana cincta, commonly known as the banded hickory borer. It was described by Drury in 1773. It is about 15–30 mm in length and occurs throughout the eastern half of North America, including Mexico and the Bahamas. If roughly handled it may start to squeak furiously. They are usually found on hickory trees and oak trees, where they lay their eggs; the larvae bore into the trees, sometimes doing significant damage. It has three described subspecies:

- Knulliana c. cincta (Drury) - Eastern North America, Texas
- Knulliana cincta ochracea (Bates) - Southeastern United States, Northeastern Mexico, Bahamas
- Knulliana cincta sonorensis (Schaeffer) - Texas to Arizona, adjacent regions in Mexico

== Ranqueles ==
The genus Ranqueles was circumscribed by French entomologist Pierre-Émile Gounelle in 1906, with the South American R. mus assigned as the type, and at that time, only species. It now contains the following species:

Species	First described	Range
Ranqueles gounellei	Bosq, 1947	Northern central Argentina
Ranqueles mus	Gounelle, 1906	North western Argentina
Ranqueles steparius	Di Iorio, 1996	Neuquén Province in Argentina

== Scapanopygus ==
The only species in the genus Scapanopygus is Scapanopygus cinereus. Both the genus and species were described in 1913 by French entomologist Pierre-Émile Gounelle. The type specimen was collected from Averías, a municipality in Argentina, on the banks of the Salado River.

== Taygayba ==
The only species in the genus Taygayba is Taygayba venezuelensis. It was described by Martins and Galileo in 1998. It is found in Venezuela.

== Timbaraba ==
The only species in the genus Timbaraba is Timbaraba dispar. It was described by Monne and Napp in 2004. It occurs in Venezuela and has filiform (threadlike) antennae with 11 segments, and a trapezoidal mentum.
