= Scapanopygus =

Scientific classification
- Kingdom: Animalia
- Phylum: Arthropoda
- Clade: Pancrustacea
- Class: Insecta
- Order: Coleoptera
- Suborder: Polyphaga
- Infraorder: Cucujiformia
- Family: Cerambycidae
- Tribe: Bothriospilini
- Genus: Scapanopygus; Gounelle, 1913
- Species: S. cinereus

Binomial name
- Scapanopygus cinereus Gounelle, 1913

Genus of beetle

Scapanopygus cinereus is a species of beetle in the family Cerambycidae, the only species in the genus Scapanopygus. Both the genus and species were described in 1913 by French entomologist Pierre-Émile Gounelle. The type specimen was collected from Averías, a municipality in Argentina, on the banks of the Salado River.

In 2005, Monné and Napp transferred the genera Ranqueles and Scapanopygus to the tribe Bothriospilini based on cladistic analysis.
