= B. elegans =

B. elegans may refer to:

- Bailiaspis elegans, a trilobite from the Cambrian
- Bajaichthys elegans, an extinct Lutetian lamprid fish from the Monte Bolca Lagerstatten
- Balacra elegans, a moth
- Banksia elegans, a shrub or small tree found only over a 65 square kilometre area north and west of Eneabba, Western Australia
- Bathyporeia elegans, an amphipod
- Beaufortia elegans, a shrub
- Bero elegans, a fish
- Birkenia elegans, a prehistoric jawless fish
- Bomarea elegans, a flowering plant
- Bonamia elegans (syn. Breweria elegans or Breweriopsis elegans), a flowering plant found in Myanmar
- Bothriospila elegans, a beetle
- Botryllus elegans, a colonial ascidian tunicate found in Mozambique and South Africa
- Brachinus elegans, a ground beetle
- Breynia elegans, a sea urchin
- Brodiaea elegans, a flowering plant
- Bufonaria elegans, a sea snail
