= 1817 =

1817 in various calendars
- Gregorian calendar: 1817; MDCCCXVII
- Ab urbe condita: 2570
- Armenian calendar: 1266; ԹՎ ՌՄԿԶ
- Assyrian calendar: 6567
- Balinese saka calendar: 1738–1739
- Bengali calendar: 1223–1224
- Berber calendar: 2767
- British Regnal year: 57 Geo. 3 – 58 Geo. 3
- Buddhist calendar: 2361
- Burmese calendar: 1179
- Byzantine calendar: 7325–7326
- Chinese calendar: 丙子年 (Fire Rat); 4514 or 4307 — to — 丁丑年 (Fire Ox); 4515 or 4308
- Coptic calendar: 1533–1534
- Discordian calendar: 2983
- Ethiopian calendar: 1809–1810
- Hebrew calendar: 5577–5578
- Hindu calendars
- Vikram Samvat: 1873–1874
- Shaka Samvat: 1738–1739
- Kali Yuga: 4917–4918
- Holocene calendar: 11817
- Igbo calendar: 817–818
- Iranian calendar: 1195–1196
- Islamic calendar: 1232–1233
- Japanese calendar: Bunka 14 (文化１４年)
- Javanese calendar: 1744–1745
- Julian calendar: Gregorian minus 12 days
- Korean calendar: 4150
- Minguo calendar: 95 before ROC 民前95年
- Nanakshahi calendar: 349
- Thai solar calendar: 2359–2360
- Tibetan calendar: མེ་ཕོ་བྱི་བ་ལོ་ (male Fire-Rat); 1943 or 1562 or 790 — to — མེ་མོ་གླང་ལོ་ (female Fire-Ox); 1944 or 1563 or 791

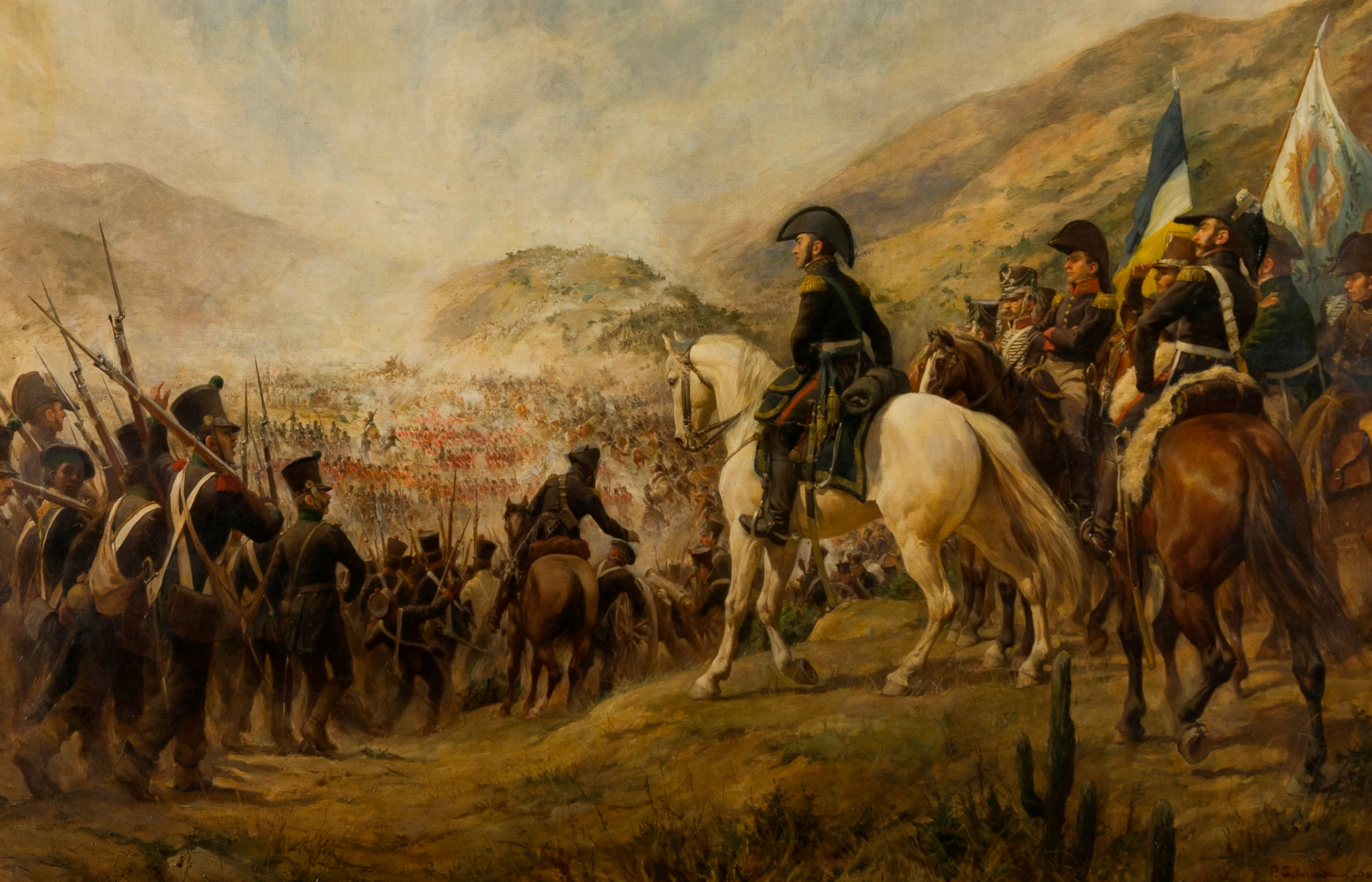
February 12: Chilean and Argentine independence fighters defeat Spanish Royal Army at Battle of Chacabuco.

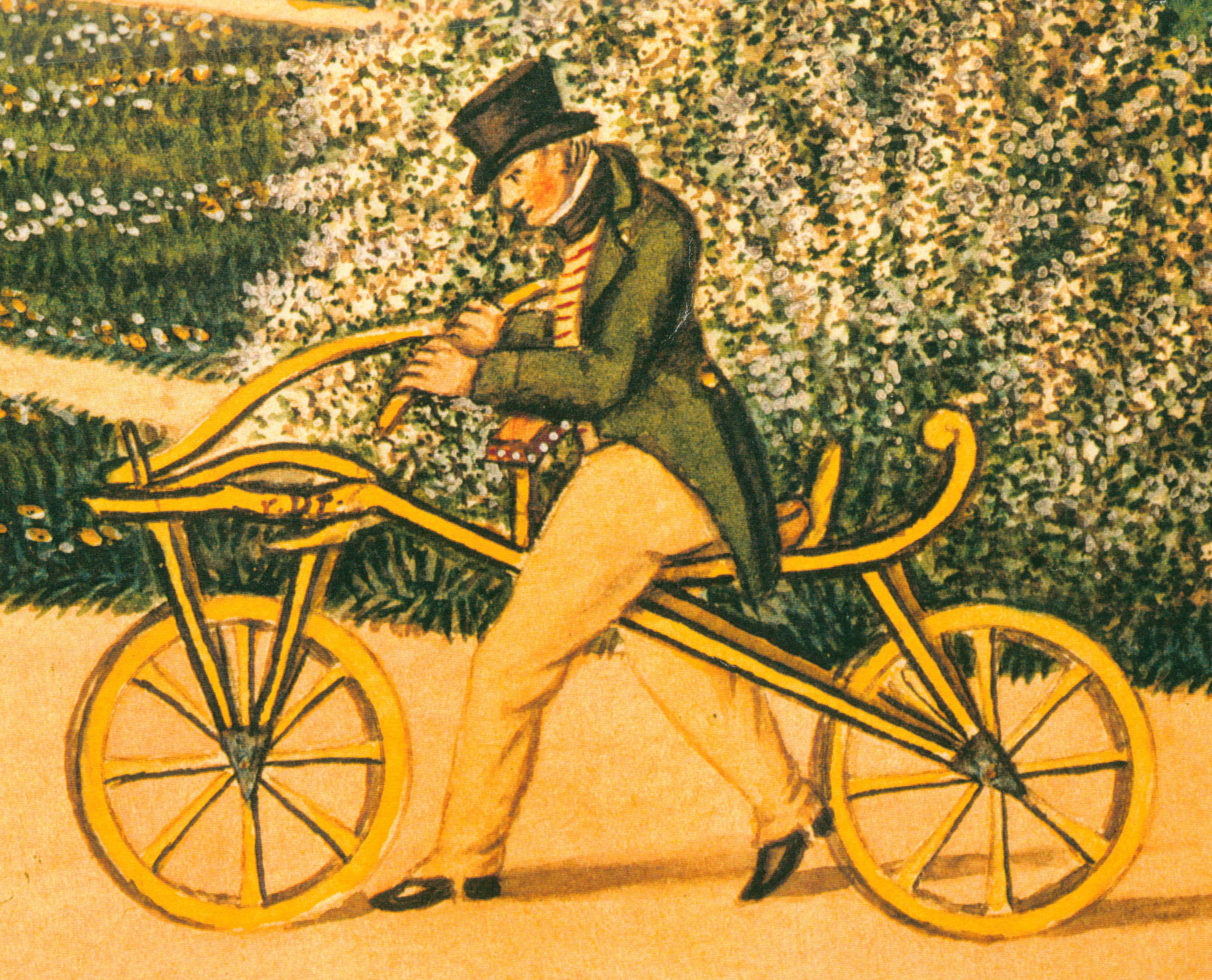
June 12: German inventor Karl Drais introduces his prototype of the bicycle.

1817 (MDCCCXVII) was a common year starting on Wednesday of the Gregorian calendar and a common year starting on Monday of the Julian calendar, the 1817th year of the Common Era (CE) and Anno Domini (AD) designations, the 817th year of the 2nd millennium, the 17th year of the 19th century, and the 8th year of the 1810s decade. As of the start of 1817, the Gregorian calendar was 12 days ahead of the Julian calendar, which remained in localized use until 1923.

== Events ==
=== January–March ===
- January 1 – Sailing through the Sandwich Islands, Otto von Kotzebue discovers New Year Island.
- January 19 – An army of 5,423 soldiers, led by General José de San Martín, starts crossing the Andes from Argentina, to liberate Chile and then Peru.
- January 20 – Ram Mohan Roy and David Hare found Hindu College, Calcutta, offering instructions in English on Western subjects, including other European languages.
- February 12 – Battle of Chacabuco: Argentine and Chilean soldiers of the United Provinces of the Río de la Plata defeat the Spanish royalist troops in what is now Chile, marking the turning point in the war against European rule of South America.
- March 3
  - On his last day in office, U.S. President James Madison vetoes John C. Calhoun's Bonus Bill as unconstitutional after it has passed both houses of the U.S. Congress.
  - The U.S. Congress passes a law to split the Mississippi Territory, after Mississippi drafts a constitution, creating the Alabama Territory, effective in August.
- March 21 – The flag of the Pernambucan Revolt is publicly blessed by the dean of Recife Cathedral, Brazil.

=== April–June ===
- April 3 – "Princess Caraboo" appears in Almondsbury in Gloucestershire in England, and convinces the local residents that she had come to their town from a far-off island kingdom of "Javasu" in the Indian Ocean. A Portuguese sailor named Manuel Enes soon arrives and says that he speaks her mysterious language, and translates her story of an escape from pirates. After publicity, Princess Caraboo is discovered to be a servant girl from the village of Witheridge in Devon.
- April 15
  - The American School for the Deaf opens in Hartford, Connecticut.
  - An earthquake strikes Palermo in the Kingdom of the Two Sicilies.
- April 29 – The Rush–Bagot Treaty is signed between the United States and the British Empire, limiting the number of warships on the Great Lakes between the U.S. and Canada in the aftermath of settling the War of 1812.
- May 27 – The General Convention of the Episcopal Church founds the General Theological Seminary, while meeting in New York City.
- June 12
  - German inventor Karl Drais drives his dandy horse ("Draisine" or Laufmaschine), the earliest form of bicycle, in Mannheim.
  - Tradesman Jeffery Sedwards establishes the Skibbereen Abstinence Society in Ireland, considered the first organisation devoted to teetotalism in Europe.
- June 22 – King Ferdinand VII of Spain, by royal decree, makes the production and sale of tobacco a legal endeavor in Cuba, thus sparking the birth of the Cuban cigar industry.
- June 25 – A large riot breaks out in Copenhagen Prison, and the army is sent to quell it.

=== July–September ===
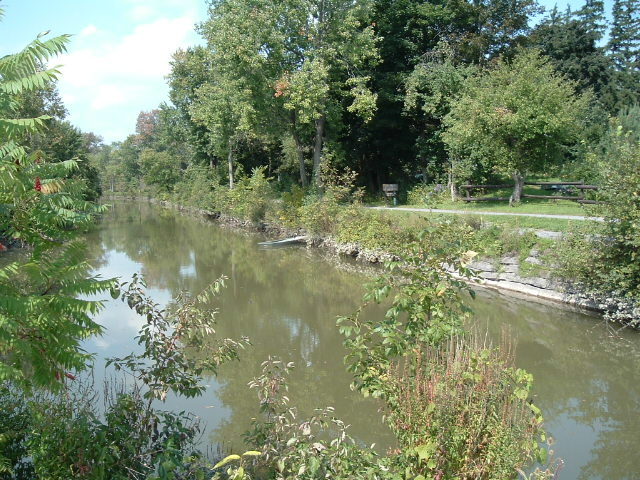
July 4: Construction on the Erie Canal starts.

- July 4
  - At Rome, New York, construction on the Erie Canal begins in the U.S. to link the Hudson River to Lake Erie, with the long-range goal of making the first navigable waterway between the Atlantic Ocean and the Great Lakes, and reducing the amount of time and costs for transporting goods westward past the Appalachian mountains.
  - 1817 Santiago del Estero earthquake. A 7.0 magnitude earthquake hits Argentina's Santiago del Estero Province.
- August 15 – By act of the U.S. Congress (March 3), the Alabama Territory is created by splitting the Mississippi Territory in half, on the day the Mississippi constitution is drafted, four months before Mississippi becomes a U.S. state.
- August 22 – The town of Araraquara, Brazil, is founded.
- August 23 – An earthquake near the site of the ancient Greek city of Helike results in 65 deaths.
- August 26 – The University of Michigan is founded in the U.S., initially near the intersection of Bates Street and Congress Street in Detroit. It will move its campus to Ann Arbor, Michigan, in 1837.
- September 11 – The Great Rebellion of 1817-18 begins in Sri Lanka.

=== October–December ===
- October 9 – The University of Ghent opens in Belgium.
- October 17 – The frigate HMS Trincomalee is launched in Bombay for the British Royal Navy. She will still be afloat two centuries later.
- October 30 – The independent government of Venezuela is established by Simón Bolívar.
- October 31 – Emperor Ninkō accedes to the throne of Japan.
- November 3 – The Bank of Montreal opens in Montreal.
- November 5 – Third Anglo-Maratha War breaks out with the Battle of Khadki.
- November 6 – Princess Charlotte of Wales, the daughter and only child of the Prince Regent George and granddaughter of King George III, dies hours after giving birth to a stillborn son. Her death, tremendously mourned by the British, throws the succession to the British throne into doubt.
- November 20 – The first Seminole War begins in Florida.
- November 22 – Frédéric Cailliaud discovers the old Mons Smaragdus emerald mines at Sikait, Egypt.
- December 10 – Mississippi is admitted as the 20th U.S. state, formerly the Mississippi Territory.

=== Date unknown ===
- The first cholera pandemic originates in Bengal, reaching Calcutta by September.
- A typhus epidemic occurs in Edinburgh and Glasgow.

== Births ==
=== January–June ===
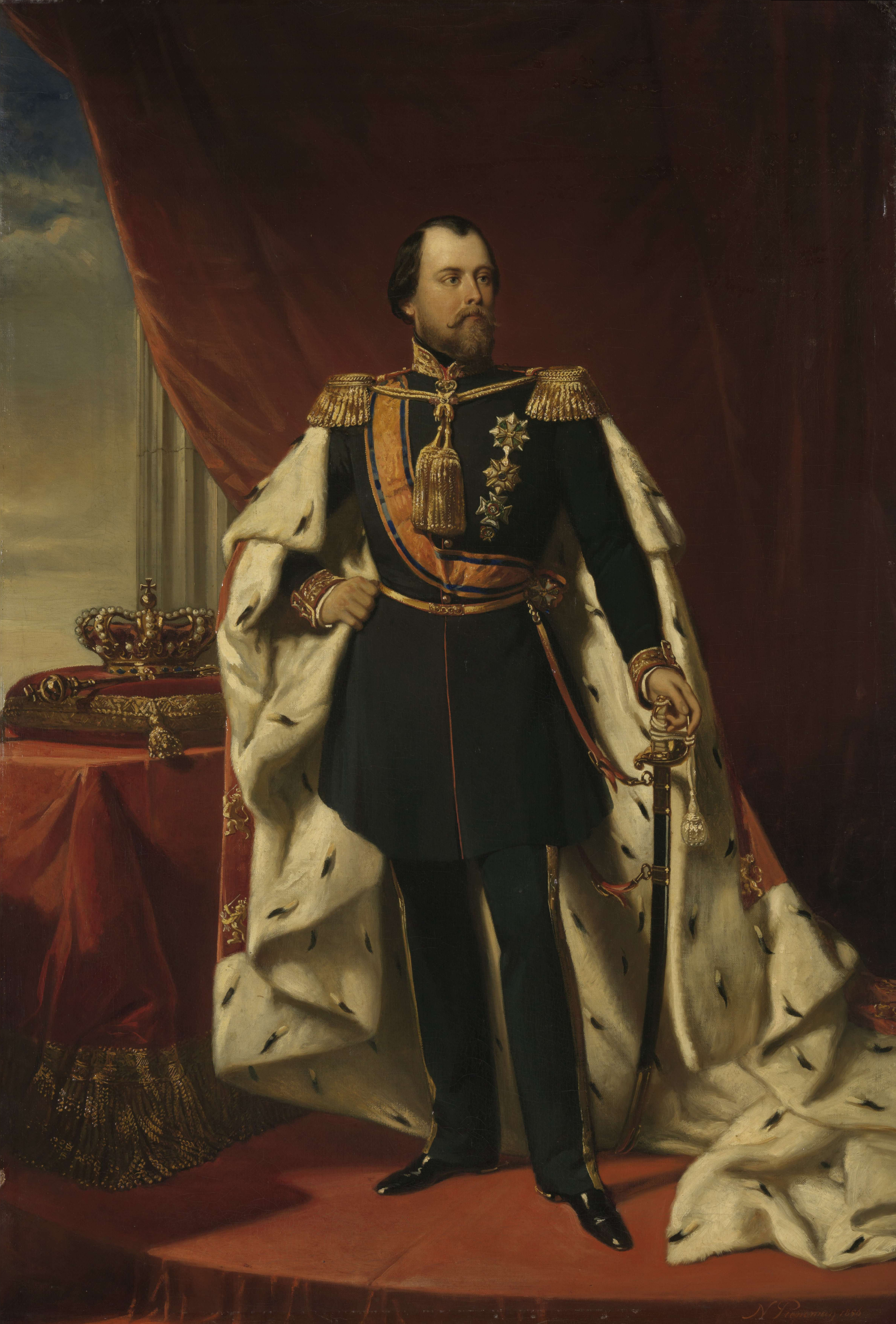
William III of the Netherlands

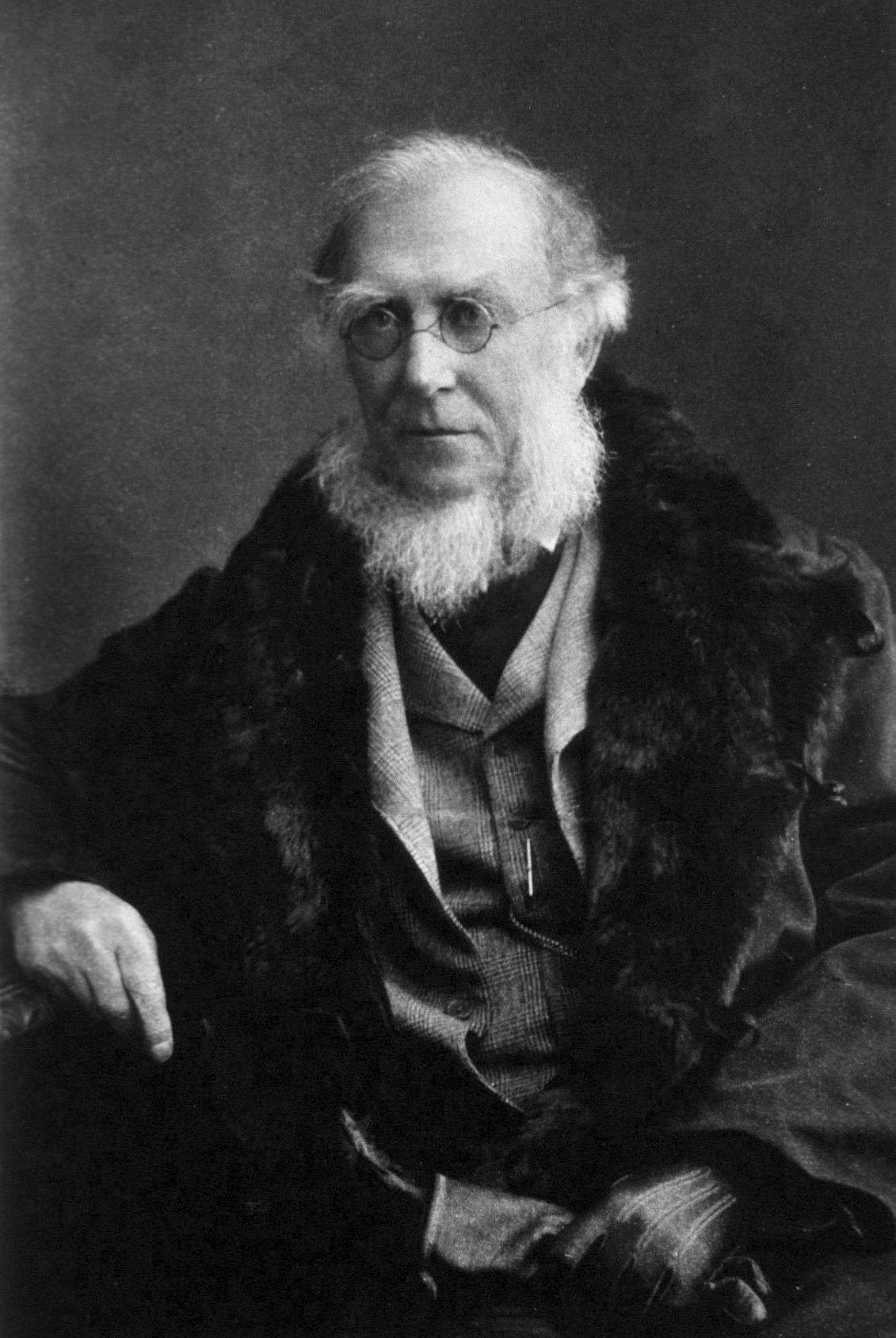
Joseph Dalton Hooker

- January 8 – Sir Theophilus Shepstone, British-born South African statesman (d. 1893)
- January 28 – Francisco de Lersundi y Hormaechea, Spanish noble and politician, Prime Minister of Spain (d. 1874)
- January 31 – John Bachmann, Swiss-American lithographer (d. 1899)
- February 17 – Édouard Thilges, 7th Prime Minister of Luxembourg (d. 1904)
- February 18 – Lewis Armistead, American Confederate general (d. 1863)
- February 19 – King William III of the Netherlands (d. 1890)
- February 22 – Carl Wilhelm Borchardt, German mathematician (d. 1880)
- February 24 – Auguste-Alexandre Ducrot, French general (d. 1882)
- March 2 – János Arany, Hungarian poet, translator, teacher, secretary of the Hungarian Academy of Sciences (d. 1882)
- March 6 – Princess Clémentine of Orléans, daughter of King Louis Philippe I of France, mother of Tsar Ferdinand I of Bulgaria (d. 1907)
- March 9 – Francisco del Rosario Sánchez, Dominican independence activist and founding father of the Dominican Republic (d. 1861)
- March 22 – Braxton Bragg, American Confederate general (d. 1876)
- April 1 – Nissen Shonin, Japanese Buddhist priest Honmon Butsuryū-shū, Kyoto city (d. 1890)
- April 15 – Benjamin Jowett, Master of Balliol College, Oxford (d. 1893)
- April 24 – Jean Charles Galissard de Marignac, Swiss chemist (d. 1894)
- May 15 – Debendranath Tagore, Indian philosopher (d. 1905)
- May 19 – Theodor August Heintzman, Canadian piano manufacturer (d. 1899)
- June 30 – Joseph Dalton Hooker, English botanist (d. 1911)

=== July–December ===
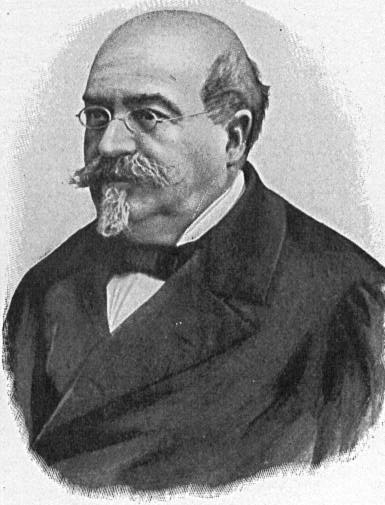
Mihail Kogălniceanu

- July 6 – Albert von Kölliker, Swiss biologist, zoologist (d. 1905)
- July 12
  - Alphonse Lecointe, French general and politician (d. 1890)
  - Henry David Thoreau, American philosopher (d. 1862)
- July 15
  - John Fowler, British civil engineer (d. 1898)
  - Franz Kuhn von Kuhnenfeld, Austrian general and politician (d. 1896)
- July 24 – Adolphe, Grand Duke of Luxembourg (d. 1905)
- July 29 – Ivan Aivazovsky, Armenian-Russian painter (d. 1900)
- August 3 – Archduke Albrecht, Duke of Teschen, Austrian general (d. 1895)
- August 4 – Frederick Theodore Frelinghuysen, 29th United States Secretary of State (d. 1885)
- August 14 – Alexander H. Bailey, American politician (d. 1874)
- August 24 – Aleksey Konstantinovich Tolstoy, Russian writer (d. 1875)
- August 25 – Marie-Eugénie de Jésus, French religious (d. 1898)
- September 6
  - Helga de la Brache, Swedish con artist (d. 1885)
  - Mihail Kogălniceanu, 3rd Prime Minister of Romania (d. 1891)
- September 14 – Theodor Storm, German writer (d. 1888)
- October 10 – Christophorus Buys Ballot, Dutch chemist, meteorologist (d. 1890)
- October 17 – Sir Syed Ahmad Khan (Bahadaur), Indian founder of the Two Nation Theory for a future Pakistan (d. 1898)
- October 30 – Hermann Franz Moritz Kopp, German chemist (d. 1892)
- November 3 – Leonard Jerome, American entrepreneur, grandfather of Sir Winston Churchill (d. 1891)
- November 12 – Bahá'u'lláh, Persian founder of the Bahá'í Faith (d. 1892)
- November 17 – Benjamin Champney, American painter (d. 1907)
- November 30 – Theodor Mommsen, German writer, Nobel Prize laureate (d. 1903)
- December 8 – Christian Emil Krag-Juel-Vind-Frijs, Prime Minister of Denmark (d. 1896)
- December 10 – Alexander Wood (physician), Scottish inventor of the first true hypodermic syringe (d. 1884)
- December 23 – Warren Felt Evans, American writer (d. 1889)

=== Date unknown ===
- Sophia Wilkens, Swedish social reformer, pioneer in the education of the intellectually disabled (d. 1889)

== Deaths ==
=== January–June ===
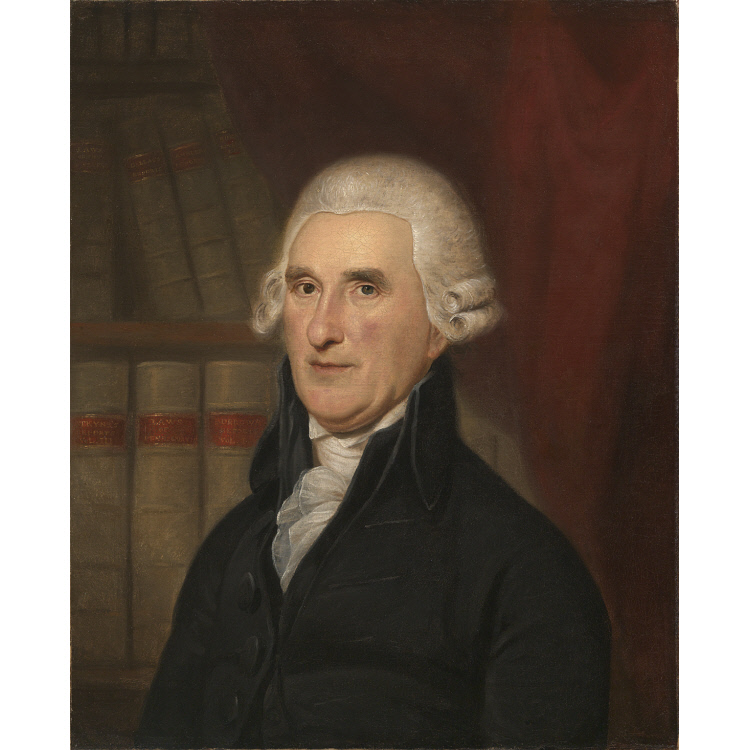
Thomas McKean

- January 1 – Martin Heinrich Klaproth, German chemist who discovered uranium (1789), zirconium (1789), and cerium (1803) (b. 1743)
- January 11 – Timothy Dwight IV, American educator, theologian (b. 1752)
- January 11 – Margherita Dalmet, Venetian dogaressa (b. 1739)
- January 12 – Juan Andrés, Spanish Jesuit (b. 1740)
- January 16 – Alexander J. Dallas, American statesman, financier (b. 1759)
- February 8 – Francis Horner, Scottish politician, economist (b. 1778)
- March 8 – Anna Maria Lenngren, Swedish writer (b. 1754)
- April 2 – Johann Heinrich Jung, German writer (b. 1740)
- April 4 – André Masséna, French marshal (b. 1758)
- April 12 – Charles Messier, French astronomer (b. 1730)
- April 20 – Infante Antonio Pascual of Spain, Spanish prince (b. 1755)
- June 2 – Clotilde Tambroni, Italian philologist, linguist (b. 1758)
- June 4 – George Farragut, American naval officer (b. 1755)
- June 9 – Théroigne de Méricourt, French revolutionary (b. 1762)
- June 13
  - Richard Lovell Edgeworth, Anglo-Irish, politician writer and inventor (b. 1744)
  - Esther de Gélieu, Swiss educator (b. 1757)
- June 18 – Leonard Neale, American Catholic bishop (b. 1746)
- June 20 – Marie-Gabriel-Florent-Auguste de Choiseul-Gouffier, French diplomat (b. 1752)
- June 24 – Thomas McKean, American lawyer, signer of the Declaration of Independence (b. 1734)
- June 30 – Abraham Gottlob Werner, German geologist (b. 1750)

=== July–December ===
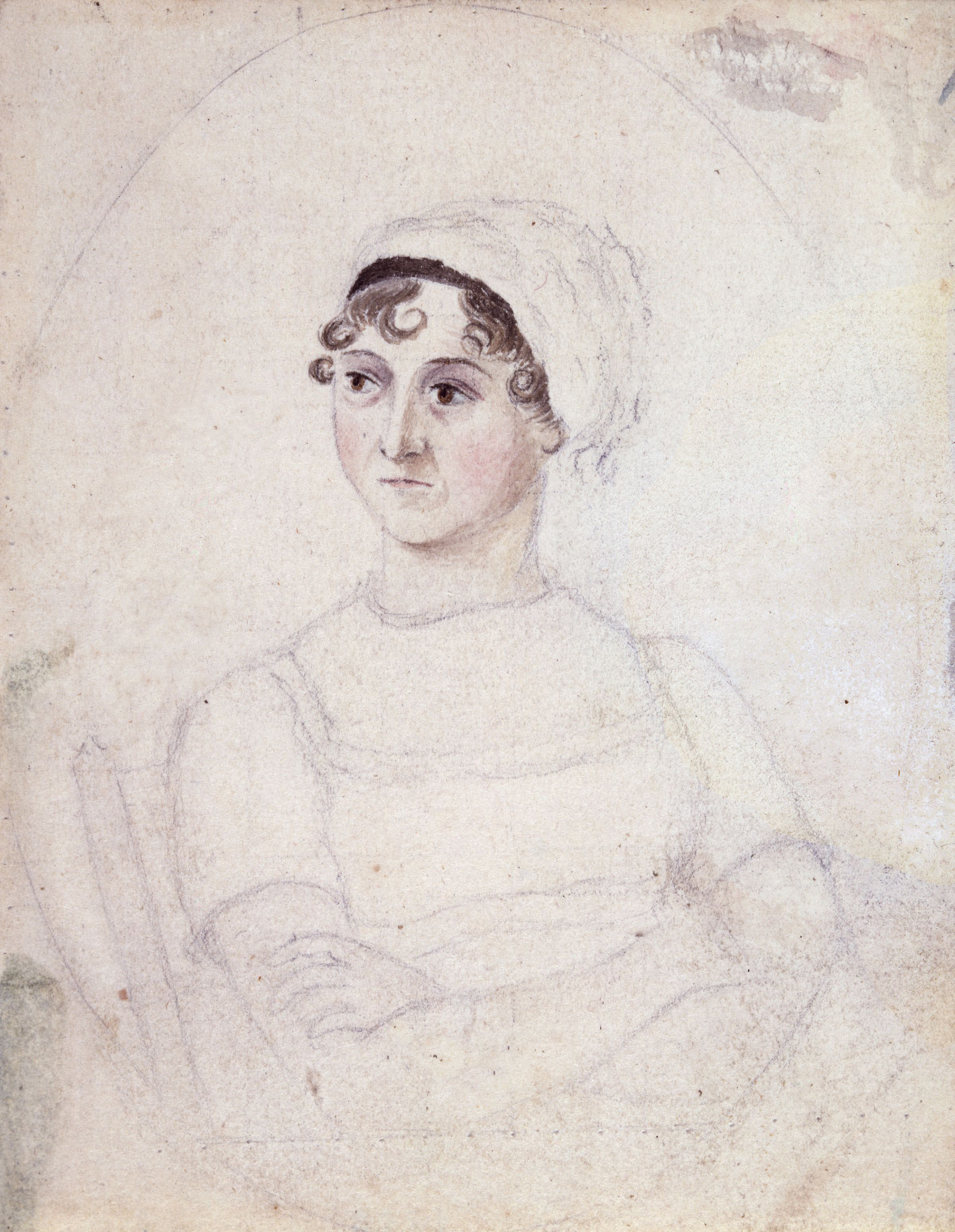
Jane Austen

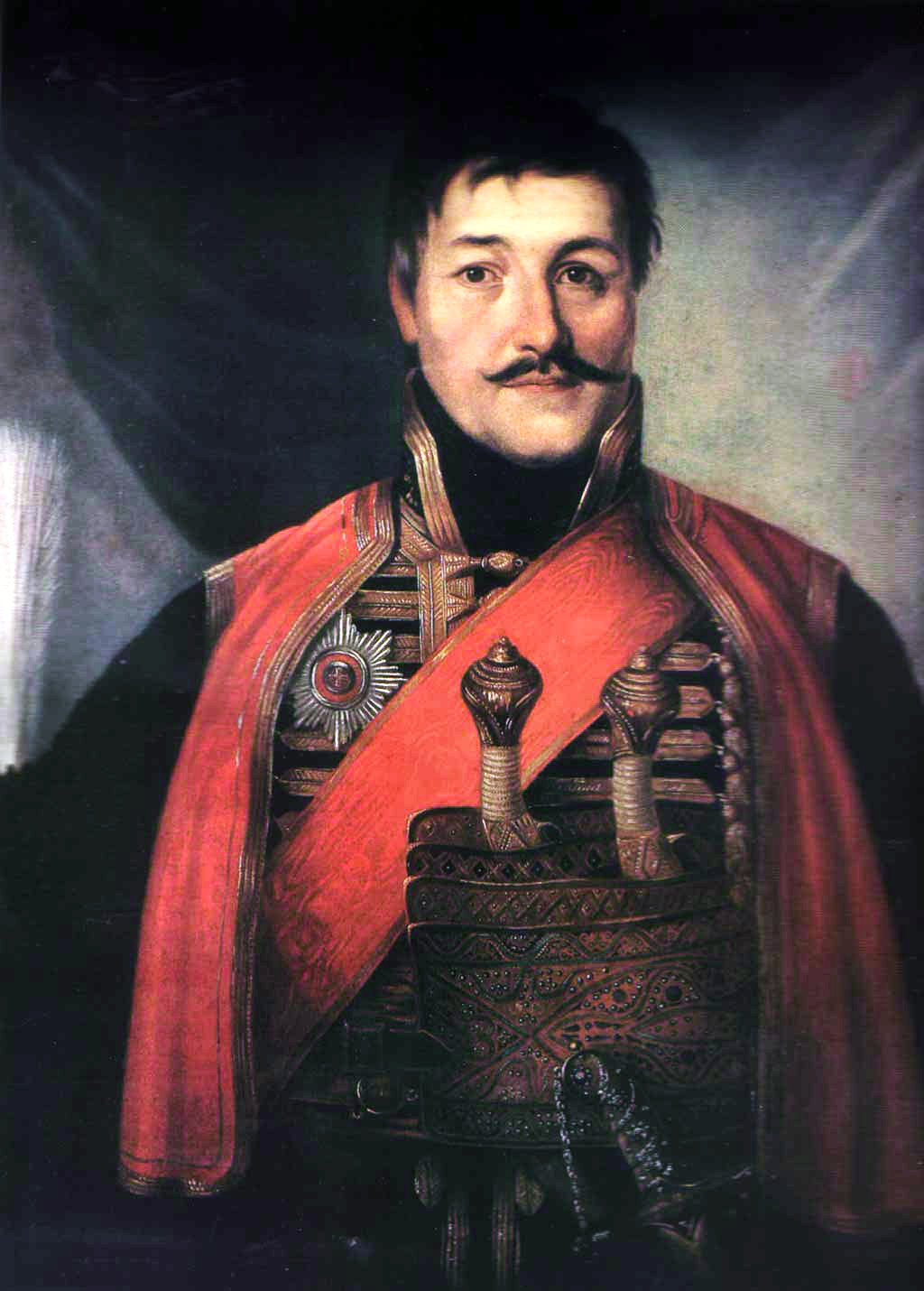
Karađorđe

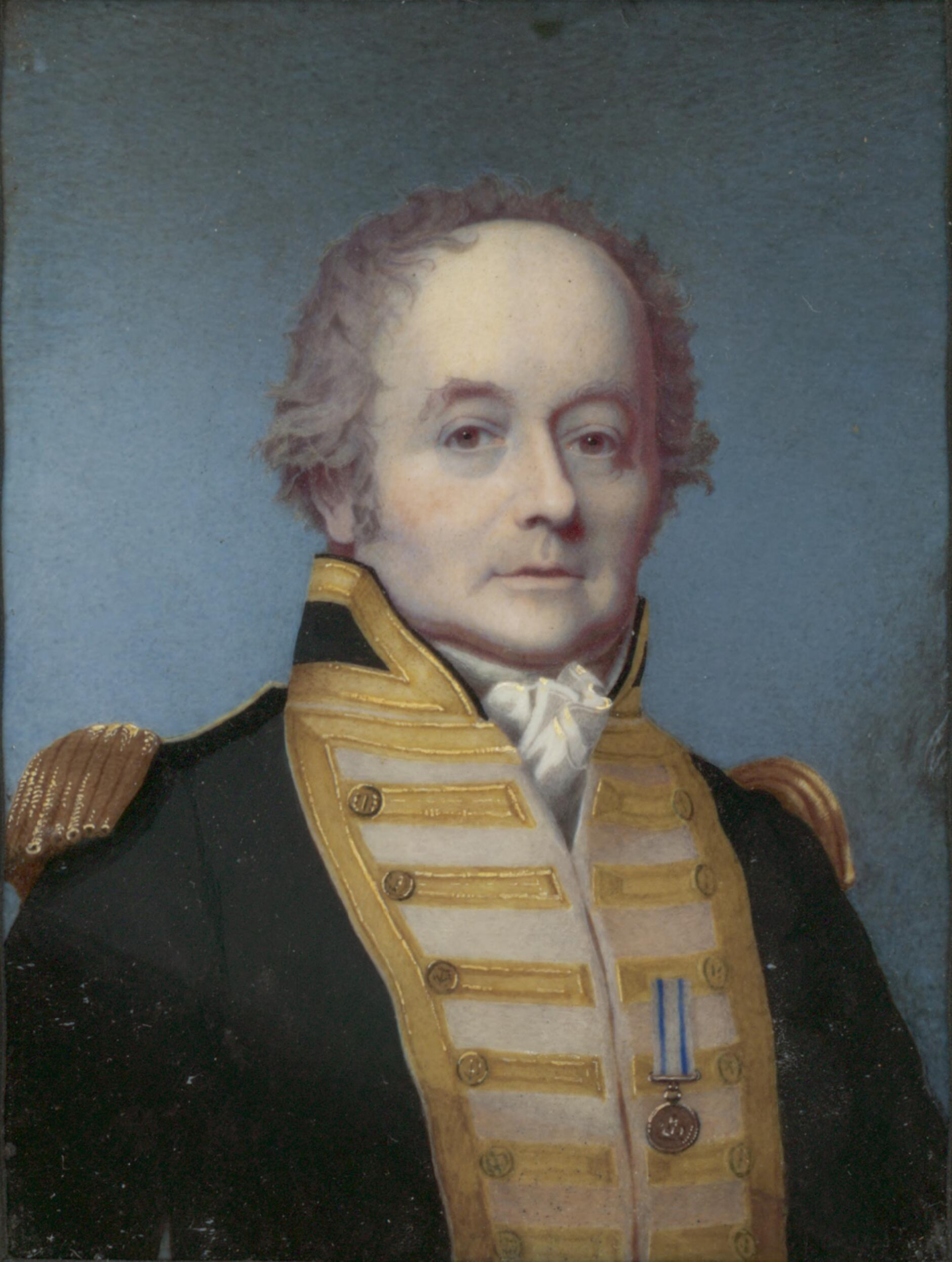
William Bligh

- July 14 – Anne Louise Germaine de Staël, French writer (b. 1766)
- July 18 – Jane Austen, English novelist (b. 1775)
- July 19 – John Palmer, Bath architect (b. c. 1738)
- July 24 – Karađorđe Petrović, Serb leader of the First Serbian Uprising against the Ottoman Empire, founder of the Serbian Karađorđević dynasty (b. 1768)
- August 7 – Pierre Samuel du Pont de Nemours, French politician (b. 1739)
- August 10 – Leopold III, Duke of Anhalt-Dessau (b. 1740)
- September 18 – David Hall, American judge (b. 1752)
- October 11 – Gertrudis Bocanegra, Mexican national heroine (b. 1765)
- October 13 – Julius Caesar Ibbetson, English artist (b. 1759)
- October 15 – Tadeusz Kościuszko, exiled Polish general, nationalist (b. 1746)
- October 16 – Manuel Piar, Venezuelan military leader (b. 1774)
- November 6 – Princess Charlotte of Wales, heir presumptive to the British throne (b. 1796)
- November 7 – Jean-André Deluc, Swiss geologist (b. 1727)
- November 11 – Francisco Javier Mina, Spanish military leader (b. 1789) (executed)
- November 14 – Policarpa Salavarrieta, Colombian spy, revolutionary who worked for the independence of Colombia (b. 1795)
- November 30 – Jean-Baptiste-Melchior Hertel de Rouville, Canadian politician (b. 1748)
- December 7 – William Bligh, British admiral (b. 1754)
- December 1 – Justin Heinrich Knecht, German composer, organist and music theorist (b. 1752)
- December 12 – Emperor Tekle Giyorgis I of Ethiopia, (b. c. 1751)
- December 15
  - Usman dan Fodio, founder of Sokoto caliphate (b. 1754)
  - Federigo Zuccari, astronomer, director of the Astronomical Observatory of Naples (b. 1783)
