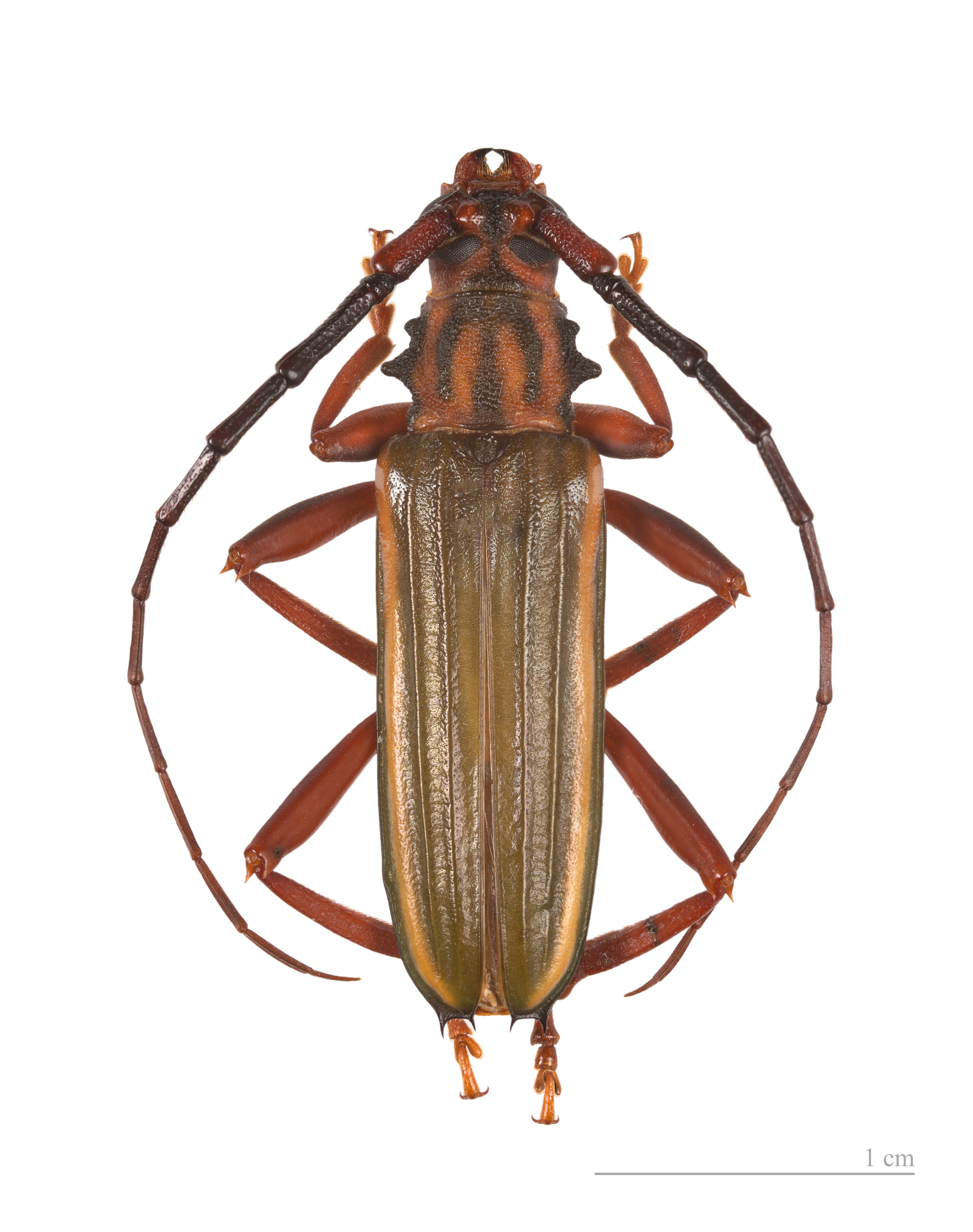
- Chlorida festiva

Scientific classification
- Domain: Eukaryota
- Kingdom: Animalia
- Phylum: Arthropoda
- Class: Insecta
- Order: Coleoptera
- Suborder: Polyphaga
- Infraorder: Cucujiformia
- Family: Cerambycidae
- Subfamily: Cerambycinae
- Tribe: Bothriospilini
- Genus: Chlorida; Audinet-Serville, 1834

= Chlorida =

Genus of beetle

Chlorida is a genus of beetles in the family Cerambycidae, containing the following species:

Adult males of Chlorida festiva and Chlorida costata produce (6E,8Z)-6,8-pentadecadienal, an attractant pheromone.

== Species ==
- Chlorida cincta Guérin-Méneville, 1844
- Chlorida costata Audinet-Serville, 1834
- Chlorida curta Thomson, 1857
- Chlorida denticulata Buquet, 1860
- Chlorida fasciata Bates, 1870
- Chlorida festiva (Linnaeus, 1758)
- Chlorida inexpectata Martins, Galileo & Oliveira, 2011
- Chlorida obliqua Buquet, 1852
- Chlorida spinosa Aurivillius, 1887
- Chlorida transversalis Buquet in Guérin-Méneville, 1844
