= Timbaraba =

Scientific classification
- Kingdom: Animalia
- Phylum: Arthropoda
- Clade: Pancrustacea
- Class: Insecta
- Order: Coleoptera
- Suborder: Polyphaga
- Infraorder: Cucujiformia
- Family: Cerambycidae
- Subfamily: Cerambycinae
- Tribe: Bothriospilini
- Genus: Timbaraba; Monné & Napp, 2004
- Species: T. dispar

Binomial name
- Timbaraba dispar Monné & Napp, 2004

Genus of beetle

Timbaraba dispar is a species of beetle in the tribe Bothriospilini (family Cerambycidae), and the only species in the genus Timbaraba. Both the genus and its species were described in 2004 by Brazilian entomologists Marcela Laura Monné and Dilma Solange Napp. Timbaraba dispar occurs in Venezuela. It has filiform (threadlike) antennae with 11 segments, and a trapezoidal mentum. The genus name Timbaraba – an indigenous word that means "sprinkles of white" – refers to the eburneous (resembling ivory) callosities that occur on the elytra.
