= Drycothaea viridescens =

Scientific classification
- Kingdom: Animalia
- Phylum: Arthropoda
- Class: Insecta
- Order: Coleoptera
- Suborder: Polyphaga
- Infraorder: Cucujiformia
- Family: Cerambycidae
- Genus: Drycothaea
- Species: D. viridescens

Binomial name
- Drycothaea viridescens (Buquet, 1857)

Synonyms
- Atelodesmis viridescens Buquet, 1857; Hastatis viridescens Thomson, 1868

Species of beetle

Drycothaea viridescens is a species of beetle in the family Cerambycidae. It was described by Jean Baptiste Lucien Buquet in 1857. It is known from Argentina, Brazil and Paraguay.
