= Ranqueles =

Ranqueles may refer to:

- Ranquel people, an ethnic group of Argentina
- Ranqueles (beetle), a genus of beetles
