= Phacellus cuvieri =

Scientific classification
- Domain: Eukaryota
- Kingdom: Animalia
- Phylum: Arthropoda
- Class: Insecta
- Order: Coleoptera
- Suborder: Polyphaga
- Infraorder: Cucujiformia
- Family: Cerambycidae
- Genus: Phacellus
- Species: P. cuvieri

Binomial name
- Phacellus cuvieri Buquet, 1851

Species of beetle

Phacellus cuvieri is a species of beetle in the family Cerambycidae. It was described by Buquet in 1851. It is known from Brazil.
