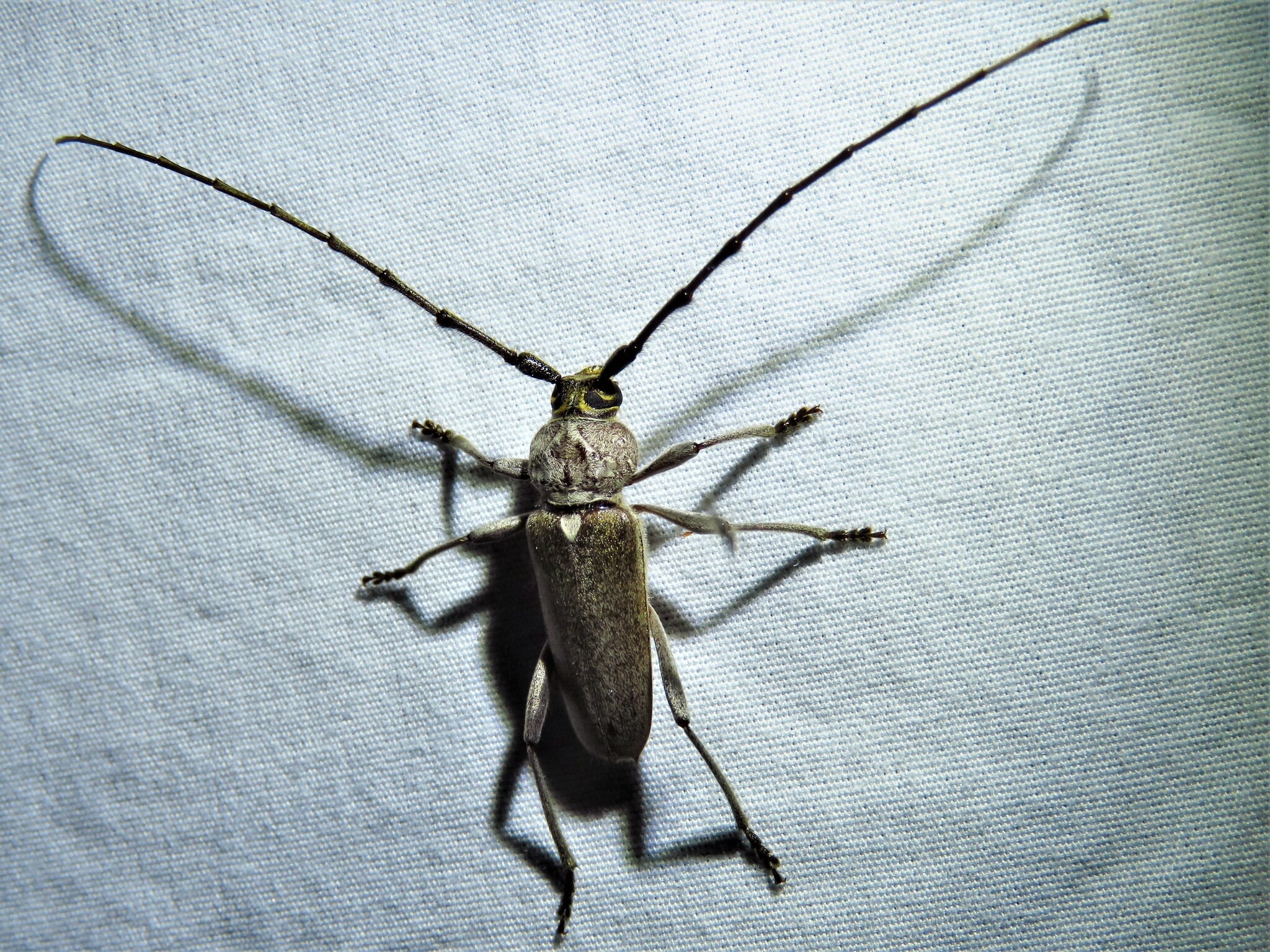
- Gnaphalodes trachyderoides, Texas

Scientific classification
- Domain: Eukaryota
- Kingdom: Animalia
- Phylum: Arthropoda
- Class: Insecta
- Order: Coleoptera
- Suborder: Polyphaga
- Infraorder: Cucujiformia
- Family: Cerambycidae
- Tribe: Bothriospilini
- Genus: Gnaphalodes; Thomson, 1860
- Species: G. trachyderoides

Binomial name
- Gnaphalodes trachyderoides Thomson, 1860

= Gnaphalodes =

Genus of beetle

Gnaphalodes trachyderoides is a species of beetle in the family Cerambycidae, the only species in the genus Gnaphalodes. It is found in the southern United States, Mexico, and Central America.
