= 1817 in Iran =

- Decades
- See also: Other events of 1817; Years in Iran

The following lists events that happened during 1817 in Qajar era.

== Incumbents ==
- Monarch: Fath-Ali Shah Qajar

== Births ==
- November 12 – Baháʼu'lláh, founder of the Bahá'í Faith.
- ? – Táhirih, influential poet and theologian of the Bábí faith in Iran.
