= Pseudophimosia sexlineata =

Scientific classification
- Kingdom: Animalia
- Phylum: Arthropoda
- Class: Insecta
- Order: Coleoptera
- Suborder: Polyphaga
- Infraorder: Cucujiformia
- Family: Cerambycidae
- Genus: Pseudophimosia
- Species: P. sexlineata

Binomial name
- Pseudophimosia sexlineata (Buquet, 1859)

Species of beetle

Pseudophimosia sexlineata is a species of beetle in the family Cerambycidae.

It was first described by French entomologist Jean Baptiste Lucien Buquet in 1859.
