= Taygayba =

Scientific classification
- Kingdom: Animalia
- Phylum: Arthropoda
- Class: Insecta
- Order: Coleoptera
- Suborder: Polyphaga
- Infraorder: Cucujiformia
- Family: Cerambycidae
- Tribe: Bothriospilini
- Genus: Taygayba; Martins & Galileo, 1998
- Species: T. venezuelensis

Binomial name
- Taygayba venezuelensis Martins & Galileo, 1998

Genus of beetle

Taygayba venezuelensis is a species of beetle in the family Cerambycidae, the only species in the genus Taygayba. Both the genus and species were described in 1998 by Brazilian entomologists Ubirajara Ribeiro Martins and Maria Helena Mainieri Galileo. As its species epithet suggests, the beetle is found in Venezuela.
