= General Taboada Department =

- Department
- Location of General Taboada Department within Santiago del Estero Province
- Coordinates: 28°27′36″S 62°50′2″W
- Country: Argentina
- Province: Santiago del Estero
- Head town: Añatuya

Area
  - Total: 6,040 km^{2} (2,330 sq mi)

Population (2010)
  - Total: 38,105
  - Density: 6.31/km^{2} (16.3/sq mi)
- Time zone: UTC-3 (ART)

General Taboada Department (Spanish: Departamento General Taboada) is a department of Argentina in Santiago del Estero Province. The capital city of the department is situated in Añatuya.

== Municipalities ==
The department comprises the following municipalities:

- Añatuya
- Averías
- Estación Tacañitas
- Los Juríes
- Tomas Young
