= Microibidion rubicundulum =

Scientific classification
- Kingdom: Animalia
- Phylum: Arthropoda
- Class: Insecta
- Order: Coleoptera
- Suborder: Polyphaga
- Infraorder: Cucujiformia
- Family: Cerambycidae
- Genus: Microibidion
- Species: M. rubicundulum

Binomial name
- Microibidion rubicundulum (Gounelle, 1913)

Synonyms
- Heterachthes rubicundulus Gounelle, 1913

Species of beetle in the family Cerambycidae

Microibidion rubicundulum is a species of beetle in the family Cerambycidae. It was described by Pierre-Émile Gounelle in 1913. It is known from Santiago del Estero Province, Argentina.

Microibidion rubicundulum measure 4.5–6 mm (0.18–0.24 in) in length.
