= Phacellus dejeani =

Scientific classification
- Domain: Eukaryota
- Kingdom: Animalia
- Phylum: Arthropoda
- Class: Insecta
- Order: Coleoptera
- Suborder: Polyphaga
- Infraorder: Cucujiformia
- Family: Cerambycidae
- Genus: Phacellus
- Species: P. dejeani

Binomial name
- Phacellus dejeani Buquet, 1838

Species of beetle

Phacellus dejeani is a species of beetle in the family Cerambycidae. It was described by Buquet in 1838. It is known from Brazil.
