= Drycothaea turrialbae =

Scientific classification
- Kingdom: Animalia
- Phylum: Arthropoda
- Class: Insecta
- Order: Coleoptera
- Suborder: Polyphaga
- Infraorder: Cucujiformia
- Family: Cerambycidae
- Genus: Drycothaea
- Species: D. turrialbae

Binomial name
- Drycothaea turrialbae (Breuning, 1943)

Synonyms
- Estoloides turri-albae Breuning, 1943; Estoloides turrialbae Breuning, 1963

Species of beetle

Drycothaea turrialbae is a species of beetle in the family Cerambycidae. It was described by Stephan von Breuning in 1943. It is known from Costa Rica.
