= Drycothaea maculata =

Scientific classification
- Domain: Eukaryota
- Kingdom: Animalia
- Phylum: Arthropoda
- Class: Insecta
- Order: Coleoptera
- Suborder: Polyphaga
- Infraorder: Cucujiformia
- Family: Cerambycidae
- Genus: Drycothaea
- Species: D. maculata

Binomial name
- Drycothaea maculata Martins & Galileo, 2003

Species of beetle

Drycothaea maculata is a species of beetle in the family Cerambycidae. It was described by Martins and Galileo in 2003. It is known in Bolivia.
