= Drycothaea mexicana =

Scientific classification
- Kingdom: Animalia
- Phylum: Arthropoda
- Class: Insecta
- Order: Coleoptera
- Suborder: Polyphaga
- Infraorder: Cucujiformia
- Family: Cerambycidae
- Genus: Drycothaea
- Species: D. mexicana

Binomial name
- Drycothaea mexicana (Breuning, 1974)

Synonyms
- Trichestola mexicana Breuning, 1974

Species of beetle

Drycothaea mexicana is a species of beetle in the family Cerambycidae. It was described by Breuning in 1974. It is known from Mexico.
