= Drycothaea testaceipes =

Scientific classification
- Domain: Eukaryota
- Kingdom: Animalia
- Phylum: Arthropoda
- Class: Insecta
- Order: Coleoptera
- Suborder: Polyphaga
- Infraorder: Cucujiformia
- Family: Cerambycidae
- Genus: Drycothaea
- Species: D. testaceipes

Binomial name
- Drycothaea testaceipes Bates, 1881

Species of beetle

Drycothaea testaceipes is a species of beetle in the family Cerambycidae. It was described by Bates in 1881. It is known from Guatemala and Mexico.
