= Chlorida transversalis =

Scientific classification
- Domain: Eukaryota
- Kingdom: Animalia
- Phylum: Arthropoda
- Class: Insecta
- Order: Coleoptera
- Suborder: Polyphaga
- Infraorder: Cucujiformia
- Family: Cerambycidae
- Genus: Chlorida
- Species: C. transversalis

Binomial name
- Chlorida transversalis Buquet, 1844

Species of beetle

Chlorida transversalis is a species of beetle in the family Cerambycidae. It was described by Jean Baptiste Lucien Buquet in 1844. It is known from Colombia.
