= Phacellus fulguratus =

Scientific classification
- Domain: Eukaryota
- Kingdom: Animalia
- Phylum: Arthropoda
- Class: Insecta
- Order: Coleoptera
- Suborder: Polyphaga
- Infraorder: Cucujiformia
- Family: Cerambycidae
- Genus: Phacellus
- Species: P. fulguratus

Binomial name
- Phacellus fulguratus Monné, 1979

Species of beetle

Phacellus fulguratus is a species of beetle in the family Cerambycidae. It was described by Monné in 1979. It is known from Brazil.
