= Drycothaea anteochracea =

Scientific classification
- Kingdom: Animalia
- Phylum: Arthropoda
- Class: Insecta
- Order: Coleoptera
- Suborder: Polyphaga
- Infraorder: Cucujiformia
- Family: Cerambycidae
- Genus: Drycothaea
- Species: D. anteochracea

Binomial name
- Drycothaea anteochracea (Breuning, 1974)

Synonyms
- Estola anteochracea Breuning, 1974; Guyanestola ochreicollis Breuning, 1974

Species of beetle

Drycothaea anteochracea is a species of beetle in the family Cerambycidae. It was described by Stephan von Breuning in 1974. It is known from Brazil and French Guiana.
