= Ranqueles (beetle) =

Scientific classification
- Kingdom: Animalia
- Phylum: Arthropoda
- Class: Insecta
- Order: Coleoptera
- Suborder: Polyphaga
- Infraorder: Cucujiformia
- Family: Cerambycidae
- Tribe: Bothriospilini
- Genus: Ranqueles; Gounelle, 1906

Species
- R. gounellei R. mus R. steparius

Genus of beetle

Ranqueles is a genus of beetles in the family Cerambycidae. The genus was circumscribed by French entomologist Pierre-Émile Gounelle in 1906, with the South American R. mus assigned as the type, and at that time, only species. It now contains the following species:

- Ranqueles gounellei Bosq, 1947
- Ranqueles mus Gounelle, 1906
- Ranqueles steparius Di Iorio, 1996
