= Añatuya =

- City
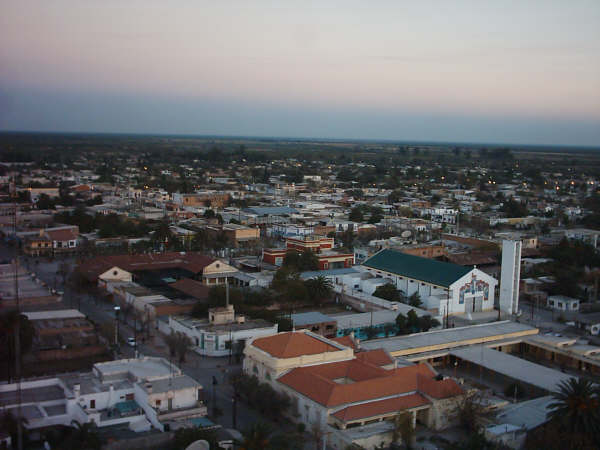
- Añatuya

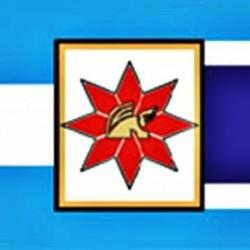
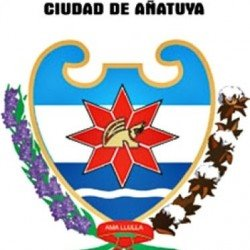
- Flag Coat of arms

- Location of Añatuya in Argentina
- Coordinates: 28°28′S 62°50′W
- Country: Argentina
- Province: Santiago del Estero
- Department: General Taboada
- Founded: July 5, 1912
- Elevation: 98 m (322 ft)

Population (2010 census)
  - Total: 23,286
- Time zone: UTC−3 (ART)
- CPA base: G3760
- Dialing code: +54 3844
- Climate: BSh
- Website: Official website

Añatuya is a city in the province of Santiago del Estero, Argentina. It has 23,286 inhabitants as per the 2010 census [INDEC], and is the head town of the General Taboada Department. It lies on the southeast of the province, east of the Salado River, and about 150 km from the provincial capital Santiago del Estero. La Añatuya is the seat of the Catholic Diocese of Añatuya, and it was the birthplace of the renowned tango composer Homero Manzi and basketball player Gabriel Deck.

== Notable people ==
- María Elisa Castro (born 1954), politician
