= Drycothaea brasiliensis =

Scientific classification
- Kingdom: Animalia
- Phylum: Arthropoda
- Clade: Pancrustacea
- Class: Insecta
- Order: Coleoptera
- Suborder: Polyphaga
- Infraorder: Cucujiformia
- Family: Cerambycidae
- Genus: Drycothaea
- Species: D. brasiliensis

Binomial name
- Drycothaea brasiliensis (Breuning, 1974)

Synonyms
- Drycothaea marmorata Galileo & Martins, 1991; Guyanestola brasiliensis Breuning, 1968

Species of beetle

Drycothaea brasiliensis is a species of beetle in the family Cerambycidae. It was described by Stephan von Breuning in 1974. It is known from Brazil and French Guiana.
