= Drycothaea indistincta =

Scientific classification
- Domain: Eukaryota
- Kingdom: Animalia
- Phylum: Arthropoda
- Class: Insecta
- Order: Coleoptera
- Suborder: Polyphaga
- Infraorder: Cucujiformia
- Family: Cerambycidae
- Genus: Drycothaea
- Species: D. indistincta

Binomial name
- Drycothaea indistincta Lingafelter & Nearns, 2007

Species of beetle

Drycothaea indistincta is a species of beetle in the family Cerambycidae. It was described by Lingafelter and Nearns in 2007. It is known from the Dominican Republic.
