= Drycothaea stictica =

Scientific classification
- Kingdom: Animalia
- Phylum: Arthropoda
- Class: Insecta
- Order: Coleoptera
- Suborder: Polyphaga
- Infraorder: Cucujiformia
- Family: Cerambycidae
- Genus: Drycothaea
- Species: D. stictica

Binomial name
- Drycothaea stictica Bates, 1881

Synonyms
- Drycothaea stictica var. lepidiota Aurivillius, 1923; Drycothea stictica Bates, 1881

Species of beetle

Drycothaea stictica is a species of beetle in the family Cerambycidae. It was described by Henry Walter Bates in 1881. It is known from Belize, Guatemala, Honduras, Mexico, Panama, and El Salvador.
