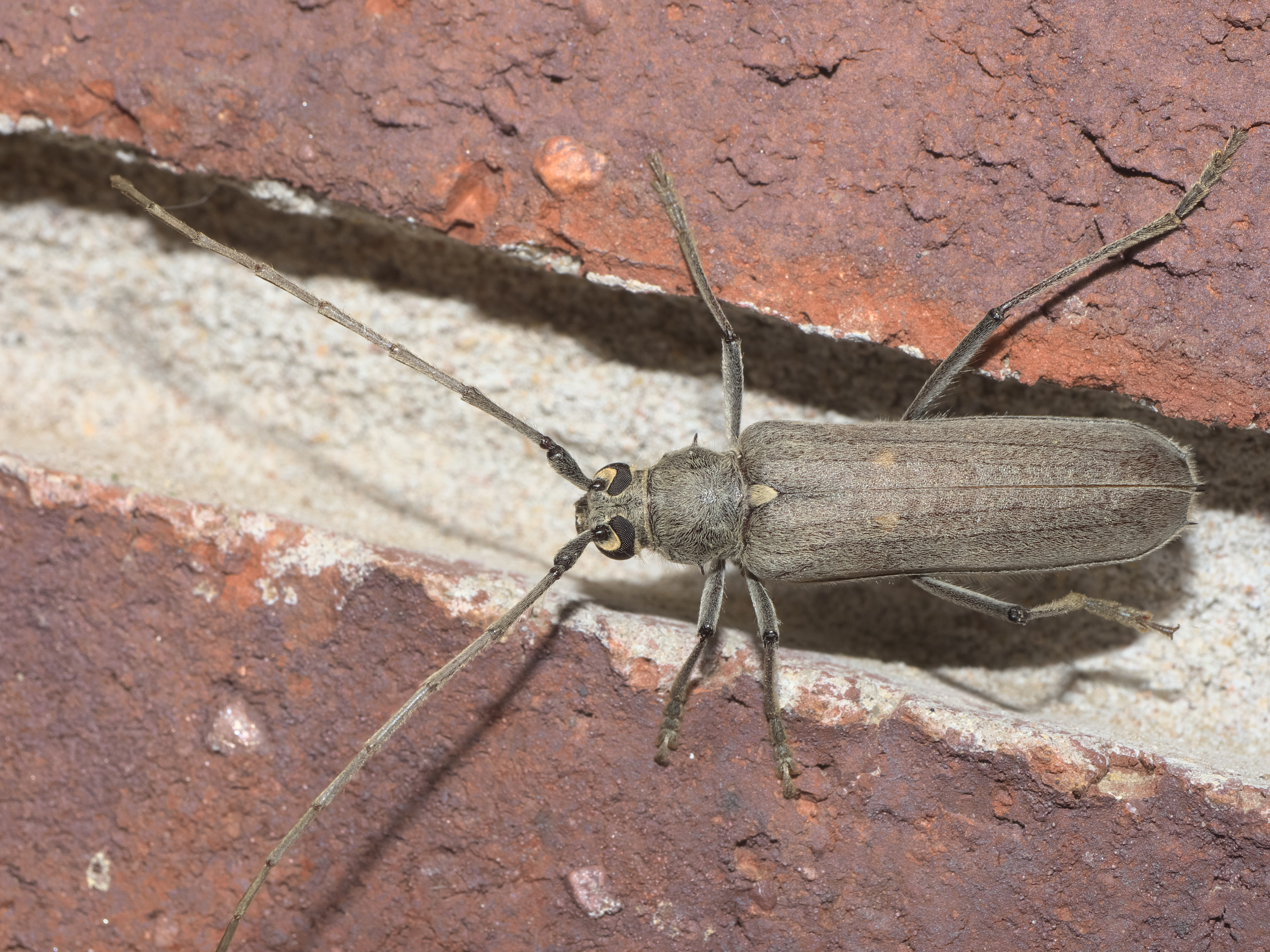

Scientific classification
- Kingdom: Animalia
- Phylum: Arthropoda
- Clade: Pancrustacea
- Class: Insecta
- Order: Coleoptera
- Suborder: Polyphaga
- Infraorder: Cucujiformia
- Family: Cerambycidae
- Subfamily: Cerambycinae
- Tribe: Bothriospilini
- Genus: Knulliana; Linsley, 1962
- Species: K. cincta

Binomial name
- Knulliana cincta (Drury, 1773)

Synonyms
- Cerasphorus Dejean, 1835; Chion Newman, 1840

Audio
- Defense squeaks of the beetle

= Knulliana =

Genus of beetle

Knulliana is a genus of longhorn beetles. It is monotypic, being represented by the single species Knulliana cincta, commonly known as the banded hickory borer. The species may be found throughout the eastern half of North America, including Mexico and the Bahamas, with one subspecies extending to the Sonoran Desert.

They are typically found on hickory and oak trees, where they lay eggs in crevices in the bark or directly into the wood. During their first season, the larvae feed beneath the bark, and later bore deeper into the wood. They sometimes cause significant damage to their host trees.

The banded hickory borer ranges in length from 15 to 35 mm (0.6 to 1.4 in). They have strong spines on the femora, pronotum, and on the tips of the elytra.

There are three described subspecies:

- Knulliana c. cincta (Drury) – eastern North America, Texas
- Knulliana cincta ochracea (Bates) – south-eastern United States, north-eastern Mexico, Bahamas
- Knulliana cincta sonorensis (Schaeffer) – Texas to Arizona, adjacent regions in Mexico
