= Microibidion =

Scientific classification
- Kingdom: Animalia
- Phylum: Arthropoda
- Clade: Pancrustacea
- Class: Insecta
- Order: Coleoptera
- Suborder: Polyphaga
- Infraorder: Cucujiformia
- Family: Cerambycidae
- Tribe: Ibidionini
- Genus: Microibidion; Martins, 1962

Genus of beetles

Microibidion is a genus of beetles in the family Cerambycidae, containing the following species:

- Microibidion bimaculatum Mehl, Galileo, Martins & Santos-Silva, 2015 – recorded from Paraguay, Bolivia and Brazil.
- Microibidion exculptum Martins, 1962 – recorded from Brazil, Paraguay and Argentina.
- Microibidion exiguum Martins, 1962 – known from southeastern Brazil, Paraguay and Argentina.
- Microibidion fiuzai Santos-Silva, Botero, Nascimento & Martins, 2020 – described from Espírito Santo, Brazil.
- Microibidion fluminense (Martins, 1962) – recorded from the Brazilian states of Bahia, Minas Gerais and Rio de Janeiro.
- Microibidion kawensis Audureau, 2015 – described from French Guiana.
- Microibidion mimicum Martins, 1971 – known from Bolivia and northern Argentina.
- Microibidion morrisi Santos-Silva & Galileo, 2017 – described from Bolivia.
- Microibidion muticum (Martins, 1962) – recorded from southeastern and southern Brazil, including Espírito Santo, Rio de Janeiro and Santa Catarina.
- Microibidion rubicundulum (Gounelle, 1913) – known from Argentina, including Santiago del Estero Province.
