= Phacellus plurimaculatus =

Scientific classification
- Domain: Eukaryota
- Kingdom: Animalia
- Phylum: Arthropoda
- Class: Insecta
- Order: Coleoptera
- Suborder: Polyphaga
- Infraorder: Cucujiformia
- Family: Cerambycidae
- Genus: Phacellus
- Species: P. plurimaculatus

Binomial name
- Phacellus plurimaculatus Galileo & Martins, 2001

Species of beetle

Phacellus plurimaculatus is a species of beetle in the family Cerambycidae. It was described by Galileo and Martins in 2001. It is known from Brazil.
