= Drycothaea angustifrons =

Scientific classification
- Kingdom: Animalia
- Phylum: Arthropoda
- Class: Insecta
- Order: Coleoptera
- Suborder: Polyphaga
- Infraorder: Cucujiformia
- Family: Cerambycidae
- Genus: Drycothaea
- Species: D. angustifrons

Binomial name
- Drycothaea angustifrons (Breuning, 1943)

Synonyms
- Drycothaea macrophthalma Galileo & Martins, 1991; Estoloides angustifrons Breuning, 1943; Guyanestola macrophthalma Breuning, 1961

Species of beetle

Drycothaea angustifrons is a species of beetle in the family Cerambycidae. It was described by Stephan von Breuning in 1943. It is known from French Guiana and Ecuador.
