= Phacellus boryi =

Scientific classification
- Domain: Eukaryota
- Kingdom: Animalia
- Phylum: Arthropoda
- Class: Insecta
- Order: Coleoptera
- Suborder: Polyphaga
- Infraorder: Cucujiformia
- Family: Cerambycidae
- Genus: Phacellus
- Species: P. boryi

Binomial name
- Phacellus boryi (Gory, 1832)

Species of beetle

Phacellus boryi is a species of beetle in the family Cerambycidae. It was described by Gory in 1832. It is known from Brazil, French Guiana and Suriname.
