= Drycothaea =

Scientific classification
- Domain: Eukaryota
- Kingdom: Animalia
- Phylum: Arthropoda
- Class: Insecta
- Order: Coleoptera
- Suborder: Polyphaga
- Infraorder: Cucujiformia
- Family: Cerambycidae
- Subfamily: Lamiinae
- Tribe: Calliini
- Genus: Drycothaea; Thomson, 1868

Genus of beetles

Drycothaea is a genus of longhorn beetles of the subfamily Lamiinae.

- Drycothaea angustifrons (Breuning, 1943)
- Drycothaea anteochracea (Breuning, 1974)
- Drycothaea bicolorata Martins & Galileo, 1990
- Drycothaea brasiliensis (Breuning, 1974)
- Drycothaea cribrata Bates, 1881
- Drycothaea curtula Bates, 1885
- Drycothaea estola (Lameere, 1893)
- Drycothaea gaucha Galileo & Martins, 2008
- Drycothaea guadeloupensis Fleutiaux & Sallé, 1889
- Drycothaea indistincta Lingafelter & Nearns, 2007
- Drycothaea jolyi Galileo & Martins, 2010
- Drycothaea maculata Martins & Galileo, 2003
- Drycothaea mexicana (Breuning, 1974)
- Drycothaea ochreoscutellaris (Breuning, 1940)
- Drycothaea ocularis Galileo & Martins, 2010
- Drycothaea parva Bates, 1885
- Drycothaea rotundicollis Galileo & Martins, 2010
- Drycothaea sallei (Thomson, 1868)
- Drycothaea spreta Bates, 1885
- Drycothaea stictica Bates, 1881
- Drycothaea testaceipes Bates, 1881
- Drycothaea truncatipennis Tavakilian, 1997
- Drycothaea turrialbae (Breuning, 1943)
- Drycothaea viridescens (Buquet, 1857)
- Drycothaea wappesi Galileo & Martins, 2010
