= Drycothaea guadeloupensis =

Scientific classification
- Domain: Eukaryota
- Kingdom: Animalia
- Phylum: Arthropoda
- Class: Insecta
- Order: Coleoptera
- Suborder: Polyphaga
- Infraorder: Cucujiformia
- Family: Cerambycidae
- Genus: Drycothaea
- Species: D. guadeloupensis

Binomial name
- Drycothaea guadeloupensis Fleutiaux & Sallé, 1889

Species of beetle

Drycothaea guadeloupensis is a species of beetle in the family Cerambycidae. It was described by Fleutiaux and Sallé in 1889. It is known from Dominica and Guadalupe.
