= Drycothaea bicolorata =

Scientific classification
- Domain: Eukaryota
- Kingdom: Animalia
- Phylum: Arthropoda
- Class: Insecta
- Order: Coleoptera
- Suborder: Polyphaga
- Infraorder: Cucujiformia
- Family: Cerambycidae
- Genus: Drycothaea
- Species: D. bicolorata

Binomial name
- Drycothaea bicolorata Martins & Galileo, 1990

Species of beetle

Drycothaea bicolorata is a species of beetle in the family Cerambycidae. It was described by Martins and Galileo in 1990. It is known from Ecuador and Brazil.
