= Phacellus =

Scientific classification
- Domain: Eukaryota
- Kingdom: Animalia
- Phylum: Arthropoda
- Class: Insecta
- Order: Coleoptera
- Suborder: Polyphaga
- Infraorder: Cucujiformia
- Family: Cerambycidae
- Tribe: Phacellini
- Genus: Phacellus

Genus of beetles

Phacellus is a genus of longhorn beetles of the subfamily Lamiinae, containing the following species:

- Phacellus boryi (Gory, 1832)
- Phacellus castaneus Monné, 1979
- Phacellus cuvieri Buquet, 1851
- Phacellus dejeani Buquet, 1838
- Phacellus fulguratus Monné, 1979
- Phacellus latreillei Buquet, 1838
- Phacellus plurimaculatus Galileo & Martins, 2001
