= Drycothaea cribrata =

Scientific classification
- Domain: Eukaryota
- Kingdom: Animalia
- Phylum: Arthropoda
- Class: Insecta
- Order: Coleoptera
- Suborder: Polyphaga
- Infraorder: Cucujiformia
- Family: Cerambycidae
- Genus: Drycothaea
- Species: D. cribrata

Binomial name
- Drycothaea cribrata Bates, 1881

Species of beetle

Drycothaea cribrata is a species of beetle in the family Cerambycidae. It was described by Bates in 1881. It is known from Honduras, Mexico and Guatemala.
