= Pseudophimosia =

Scientific classification
- Domain: Eukaryota
- Kingdom: Animalia
- Phylum: Arthropoda
- Class: Insecta
- Order: Coleoptera
- Suborder: Polyphaga
- Infraorder: Cucujiformia
- Family: Cerambycidae
- Subfamily: Cerambycinae
- Tribe: Trachyderini
- Genus: Pseudophimosia; Delfino, 1990

Genus of beetles

Pseudophimosia is a genus of beetles in the family Cerambycidae, containing the following species:

- Pseudophimosia eburioides (White, 1853)
- Pseudophimosia sexlineata (Buquet, 1859)
