= Ranqueles mus =

Scientific classification
- Kingdom: Animalia
- Phylum: Arthropoda
- Class: Insecta
- Order: Coleoptera
- Suborder: Polyphaga
- Infraorder: Cucujiformia
- Family: Cerambycidae
- Genus: Ranqueles
- Species: R. mus

Binomial name
- Ranqueles mus Gounelle, 1906

Species of beetle

Ranqueles mus is a species of beetle in the family Cerambycidae. It was described by Pierre-Émile Gounelle in 1906. It is known from central and northwestern Argentina. It feeds on Prosopis nigra.
