= Drycothaea curtula =

Scientific classification
- Kingdom: Animalia
- Phylum: Arthropoda
- Class: Insecta
- Order: Coleoptera
- Suborder: Polyphaga
- Infraorder: Cucujiformia
- Family: Cerambycidae
- Genus: Drycothaea
- Species: D. curtula

Binomial name
- Drycothaea curtula Bates, 1885

Species of beetle

Drycothaea curtula is a species of beetle in the family Cerambycidae. It was described by Bates in 1885. It is known from Panama.
