= Drycothaea sallei =

Scientific classification
- Kingdom: Animalia
- Phylum: Arthropoda
- Class: Insecta
- Order: Coleoptera
- Suborder: Polyphaga
- Infraorder: Cucujiformia
- Family: Cerambycidae
- Genus: Drycothaea
- Species: D. sallei

Binomial name
- Drycothaea sallei (Thomson, 1868)

Species of beetle

Drycothaea sallei is a species of beetle in the family Cerambycidae. It was described by Thomson in 1868. It is known from Mexico, Guatemala and Belize.
