= Drycothaea ochreoscutellaris =

Scientific classification
- Kingdom: Animalia
- Phylum: Arthropoda
- Class: Insecta
- Order: Coleoptera
- Suborder: Polyphaga
- Infraorder: Cucujiformia
- Family: Cerambycidae
- Genus: Drycothaea
- Species: D. ochreoscutellaris

Binomial name
- Drycothaea ochreoscutellaris (Breuning, 1940)

Synonyms
- Estolopsis ochreoscutellaris Breuning, 1940

Species of beetle

Drycothaea ochreoscutellaris is a species of beetle in the family Cerambycidae. It was described by Breuning in 1940. It is known from Brazil, Ecuador, French Guiana and Suriname.
