= Drycothaea estola =

Scientific classification
- Kingdom: Animalia
- Phylum: Arthropoda
- Class: Insecta
- Order: Coleoptera
- Suborder: Polyphaga
- Infraorder: Cucujiformia
- Family: Cerambycidae
- Genus: Drycothaea
- Species: D. estola

Binomial name
- Drycothaea estola (Lameere, 1893)

Synonyms
- Eumathes estola Lameere, 1893

Species of beetle

Drycothaea estola is a species of beetle in the family Cerambycidae. It was described by Lameere in 1893. It is known from Venezuela.
