= Drycothaea truncatipennis =

Scientific classification
- Domain: Eukaryota
- Kingdom: Animalia
- Phylum: Arthropoda
- Class: Insecta
- Order: Coleoptera
- Suborder: Polyphaga
- Infraorder: Cucujiformia
- Family: Cerambycidae
- Genus: Drycothaea
- Species: D. truncatipennis

Binomial name
- Drycothaea truncatipennis Tavakilian, 1997

Synonyms
- Estola stictica Breuning, 1942 nec Bates, 1881

Species of beetle

Drycothaea truncatipennis is a species of beetle in the family Cerambycidae. It was described by Tavakilian in 1997. It is known from Brazil.
