= Drycothaea jolyi =

Scientific classification
- Domain: Eukaryota
- Kingdom: Animalia
- Phylum: Arthropoda
- Class: Insecta
- Order: Coleoptera
- Suborder: Polyphaga
- Infraorder: Cucujiformia
- Family: Cerambycidae
- Genus: Drycothaea
- Species: D. jolyi

Binomial name
- Drycothaea jolyi Galileo & Martins, 2010

Species of beetle

Drycothaea jolyi is a species of beetle in the family Cerambycidae. It was described by Galileo and Martins in 2010. It is known from Peru.
