= Chlorida curta =

Scientific classification
- Domain: Eukaryota
- Kingdom: Animalia
- Phylum: Arthropoda
- Class: Insecta
- Order: Coleoptera
- Suborder: Polyphaga
- Infraorder: Cucujiformia
- Family: Cerambycidae
- Genus: Chlorida
- Species: C. curta

Binomial name
- Chlorida curta Thomson, 1857

Synonyms
- Chlorida parvula Thomson 1861

Species of beetle

Chlorida curta is a species of beetle in the family Cerambycidae. It was described by James Thomson in 1857. It is known from French Guiana, northern central Brazil, and Ecuador.
