= Ranqueles gounellei =

Scientific classification
- Kingdom: Animalia
- Phylum: Arthropoda
- Class: Insecta
- Order: Coleoptera
- Suborder: Polyphaga
- Infraorder: Cucujiformia
- Family: Cerambycidae
- Genus: Ranqueles
- Species: R. gounellei

Binomial name
- Ranqueles gounellei Bosq, 1947

Species of beetle

Ranqueles gounellei is a species of beetle in the family Cerambycidae. It was described by Bosq in 1947. It is known from northern central Argentina and Bolivia. It feeds on Acacia aroma, Prosopis chilensis, and Prosopis juliflora.
