= Bomarea elegans =

Conservation status
- Vulnerable (IUCN 3.1)

Scientific classification
- Kingdom: Plantae
- Clade: Tracheophytes
- Clade: Angiosperms
- Clade: Monocots
- Order: Liliales
- Family: Alstroemeriaceae
- Genus: Bomarea
- Species: B. elegans

Binomial name
- Bomarea elegans Sodiro

Species of flowering plant

Bomarea elegans is a species of flowering plants in the family Alstroemeriaceae. It is endemic to Ecuador, where it occurs in the forests and páramo of the Andes. It is threatened by fire, grazing, and mining.
