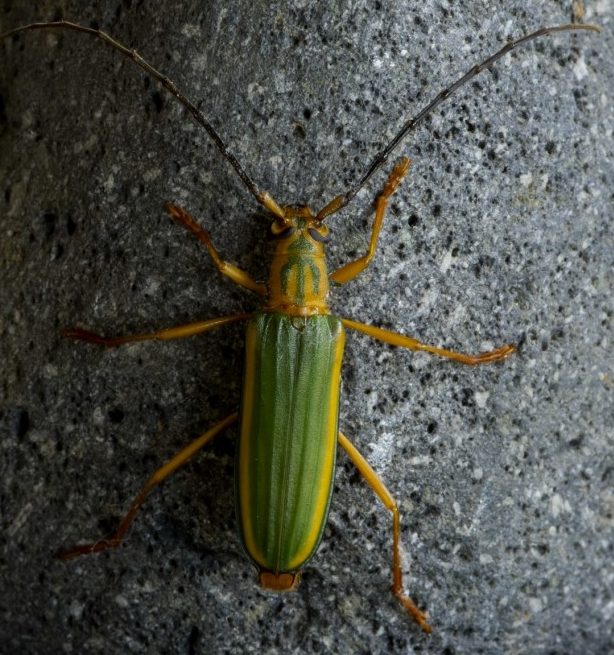

Scientific classification
- Kingdom: Animalia
- Phylum: Arthropoda
- Class: Insecta
- Order: Coleoptera
- Suborder: Polyphaga
- Infraorder: Cucujiformia
- Family: Cerambycidae
- Genus: Chlorida
- Species: C. festiva

Binomial name
- Chlorida festiva (Linnaeus, 1758)

Synonyms
- Cerambyx festivus Linnaeus, 1758; Cerambyx spinosus Degeer, 1775 (Preocc.); Cerambyx sulcatus Sulzer, 1776; Cerambyx africanus Voet, 1778 (Unav.)

= Chlorida festiva =

Species of beetle

Chlorida festiva, the festive longicorn, is a species of beetle in the family Cerambycidae. It was described by Carl Linnaeus in his landmark 1758 10th edition of Systema Naturae. It is known from southeastern United States, Central America, South America, and the West Indies. Adult males produce (6E,8Z)-6,8-pentadecadienal, an attractant pheromone. In Puerto Rico the larvae are known to be leaf mining pests of mango crops.
