= Ranqueles steparius =

Scientific classification
- Kingdom: Animalia
- Phylum: Arthropoda
- Class: Insecta
- Order: Coleoptera
- Suborder: Polyphaga
- Infraorder: Cucujiformia
- Family: Cerambycidae
- Genus: Ranqueles
- Species: R. steparius

Binomial name
- Ranqueles steparius Di Iorio, 1996

Species of beetle

Ranqueles steparius is a species of beetle in the family Cerambycidae. It was described by Osvaldo Rubén Di Iorio in 1996. It is found in Neuquén Province, Argentina.
