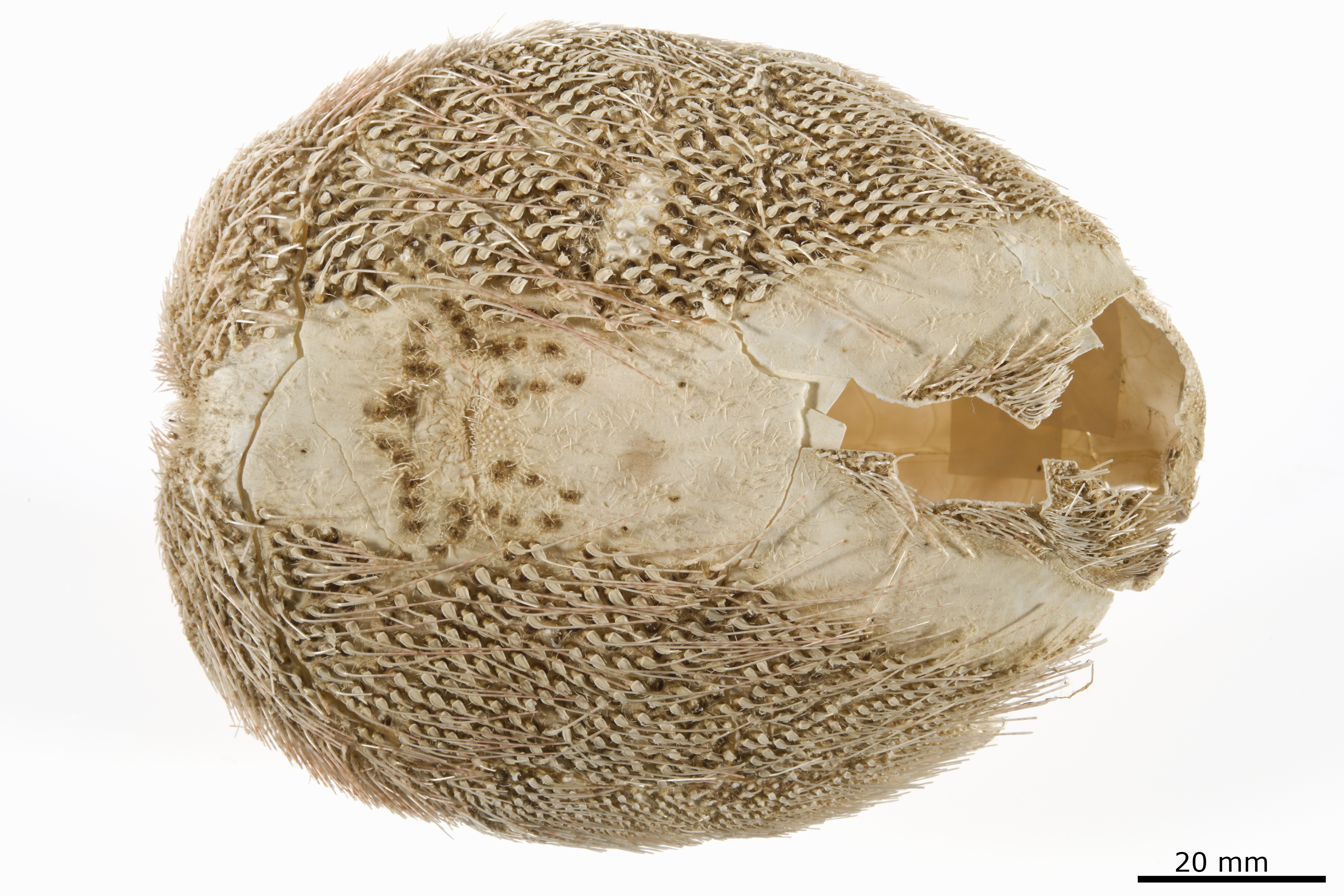

Scientific classification
- Kingdom: Animalia
- Phylum: Echinodermata
- Class: Echinoidea
- Order: Spatangoida
- Family: Loveniidae
- Genus: Breynia
- Species: B. elegans

Binomial name
- Breynia elegans Mortensen, 1948

= Breynia elegans =

Species of sea urchin

Breynia elegans is a species of sea urchins of the family Loveniidae. Their armour is covered with spines. Breynia elegans was first scientifically described in 1948 by Ole Theodor Jensen Mortensen.
