= Chlorida spinosa =

Scientific classification
- Domain: Eukaryota
- Kingdom: Animalia
- Phylum: Arthropoda
- Class: Insecta
- Order: Coleoptera
- Suborder: Polyphaga
- Infraorder: Cucujiformia
- Family: Cerambycidae
- Genus: Chlorida
- Species: C. spinosa

Binomial name
- Chlorida spinosa Aurivillius, 1887

Species of beetle

Chlorida spinosa is a species of beetle in the family Cerambycidae. It was described by Per Olof Christopher Aurivillius in 1887. It is known from Colombia, Bolivia and Peru. Adult males produce (6E,8Z)-6,8-pentadecadienal, an attractant pheromone.
