= Averías =

- Municipality and village
- Location within Argentina
- Coordinates: 28°45′S 62°27′W
- Country: Argentina
- Province: Santiago del Estero Province
- Department: General Taboada

Government
  - Municipal president: Sergio Silva
- Elevation: 256 ft (78 m)

Population (INDEC 2001)
  - Total: 162
- Time zone: UTC−3 (ART)
- Postal code: 3766
- Area code: 03845

Averías is a municipality and village in the General Taboada department, province of Santiago del Estero Province in Argentina. It is located approximately 229 km from the provincial capital city of Santiago del Estero.

== Population ==
Averías had 371 inhabitants in 2010 (INDEC, 2010), a 129% increase from the 162 inhabitants it had during the last census in 2001 (INDEC, 2001).

== Earthquakes in the Santiago del Estero Province ==
On 1 January 2011, and on 21 February and 2 September of the same year, several large areas were the epicentres of earthquakes with levels 7.0, 5.9, and 6.9 respectively, on the Richter Scale. None of these caused damage or had victims since they were registered at depths of 600km; however, the telluric movements ended up shaking tall buildings in several provinces, including the city of Buenos Aires.

== Seismicity ==
The seismicity of the Santiago del Estero area is frequent and of low intensity. It has a seismic silence of medium-to-serious earthquakes every 40 years.

On 4 July 1817 a Level 7.0 (according to the Richter Scale) earthquake occurred (the 1817 Santiago del Estero earthquake). Very serious damage was reported in the centre and north of the province, where houses collapsed and cracks appeared in the ground. The tremors lasted about a week. A scale level of VIII was estimated on the Mercalli Scale. Liquefaction occurred with large quantities of sand in cracks of up to 1 metre in width and over 2 metres in depth. In some of the houses above these cracks, the ground was covered in more than 10cm of sand.

Although geological activity has been happening since prehistory, the earthquake on 20 March 1861 set an important milestone in the history of Argentinean seismic events, since it was the strongest ever registered and documented in the country. Since then, the policy of the successive provincial and municipal governments have been very cautious and have restricted building codes - but it was only after the 1944 San Juan earthquake on 15 January that the provincial governments truly understood the severity of the region's seismicity.
