= Chlorida fasciata =

Scientific classification
- Domain: Eukaryota
- Kingdom: Animalia
- Phylum: Arthropoda
- Class: Insecta
- Order: Coleoptera
- Suborder: Polyphaga
- Infraorder: Cucujiformia
- Family: Cerambycidae
- Genus: Chlorida
- Species: C. fasciata

Binomial name
- Chlorida fasciata Bates, 1870

Species of beetle

Chlorida fasciata is a species of beetle in the family Cerambycidae. It was described by Henry Walter Bates in 1870. It is known to occur in Brazil and Peru.
