= Chlorida inexpectata =

Scientific classification
- Domain: Eukaryota
- Kingdom: Animalia
- Phylum: Arthropoda
- Class: Insecta
- Order: Coleoptera
- Suborder: Polyphaga
- Infraorder: Cucujiformia
- Family: Cerambycidae
- Genus: Chlorida
- Species: C. inexpectata

Binomial name
- Chlorida inexpectata Martins, Galileo & Oliveira, 2011

Species of beetle

Chlorida inexpectata is a species of beetle in the family Cerambycidae. It was described by Ubirajara Martins, Maria Helena Galileo and Francisco Limeira-De-Oliveira in 2011. The species epithet is derived from the Latin inexpectatus ("not expected"). It is known from Brazil.

The total length of the type specimen is 14.4 mm; the prothorax length is 4.3 mm; the greater prothorax width is 7.1 mm; the elytral length is 17.9 mm; and the humeral width is 7.1 mm.
