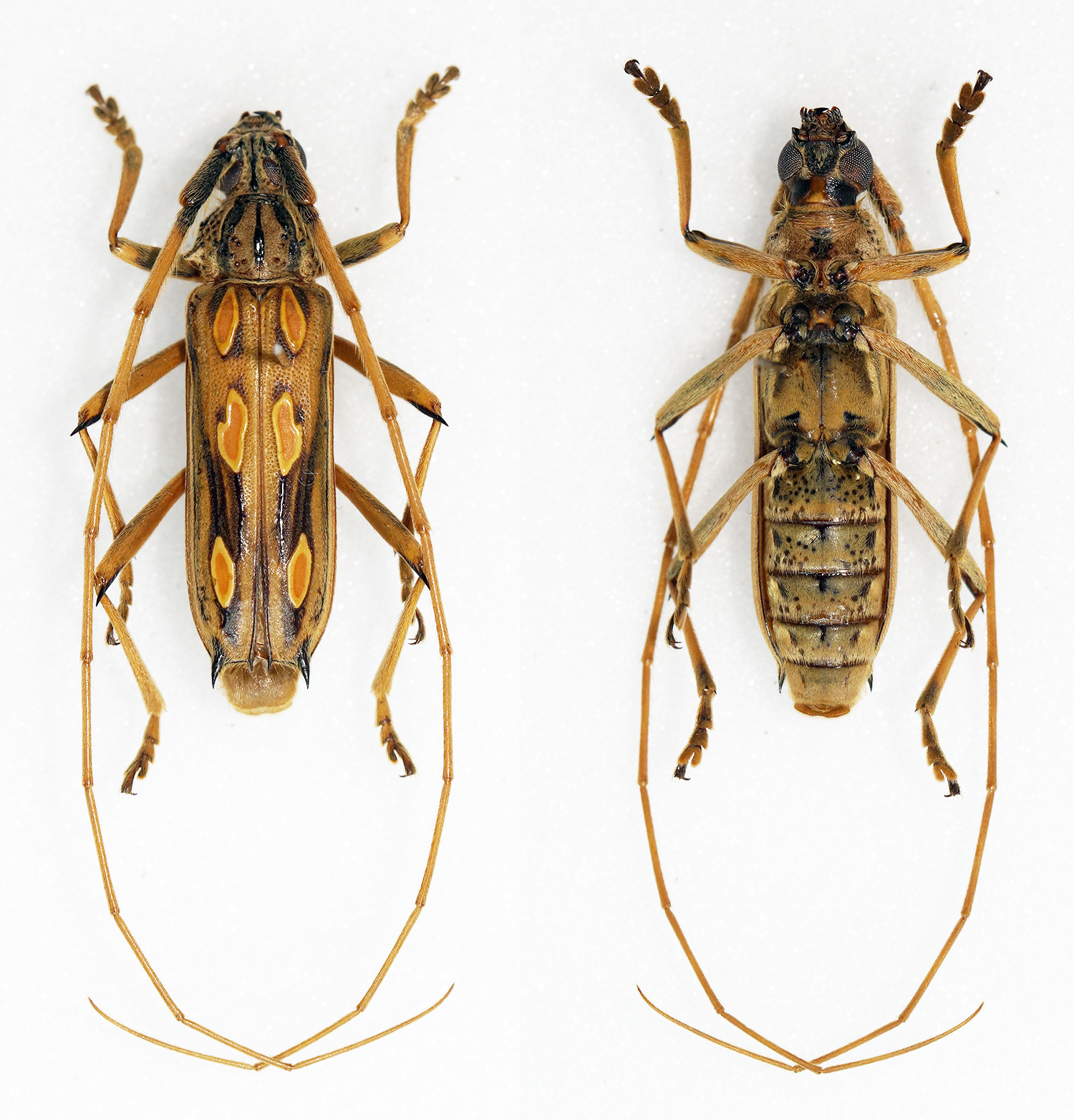
- Bothriospila elegans, Brazil

Scientific classification
- Kingdom: Animalia
- Phylum: Arthropoda
- Clade: Pancrustacea
- Class: Insecta
- Order: Coleoptera
- Suborder: Polyphaga
- Infraorder: Cucujiformia
- Family: Cerambycidae
- Subfamily: Cerambycinae
- Tribe: Bothriospilini
- Genus: Bothriospila; Aurivillius, 1923

Type species
- Bothriospila elegans Aurivillius, 1923

Species
- B. elegans B. pulcherrima

= Bothriospila =

Genus of beetles

Bothriospila is a genus of beetles in the family Cerambycidae, and the type genus of the tribe Bothriospilini. It contains two species: the type, Bothriospila elegans, found in Brazil and Paraguay, and Bothriospila pulcherrima, found in Brazil. The latter was described as a new species from Brazil in 2012. Bothriospila was circumscribed in 1923 by Swedish entomologist Per Olof Christopher Aurivillius.
