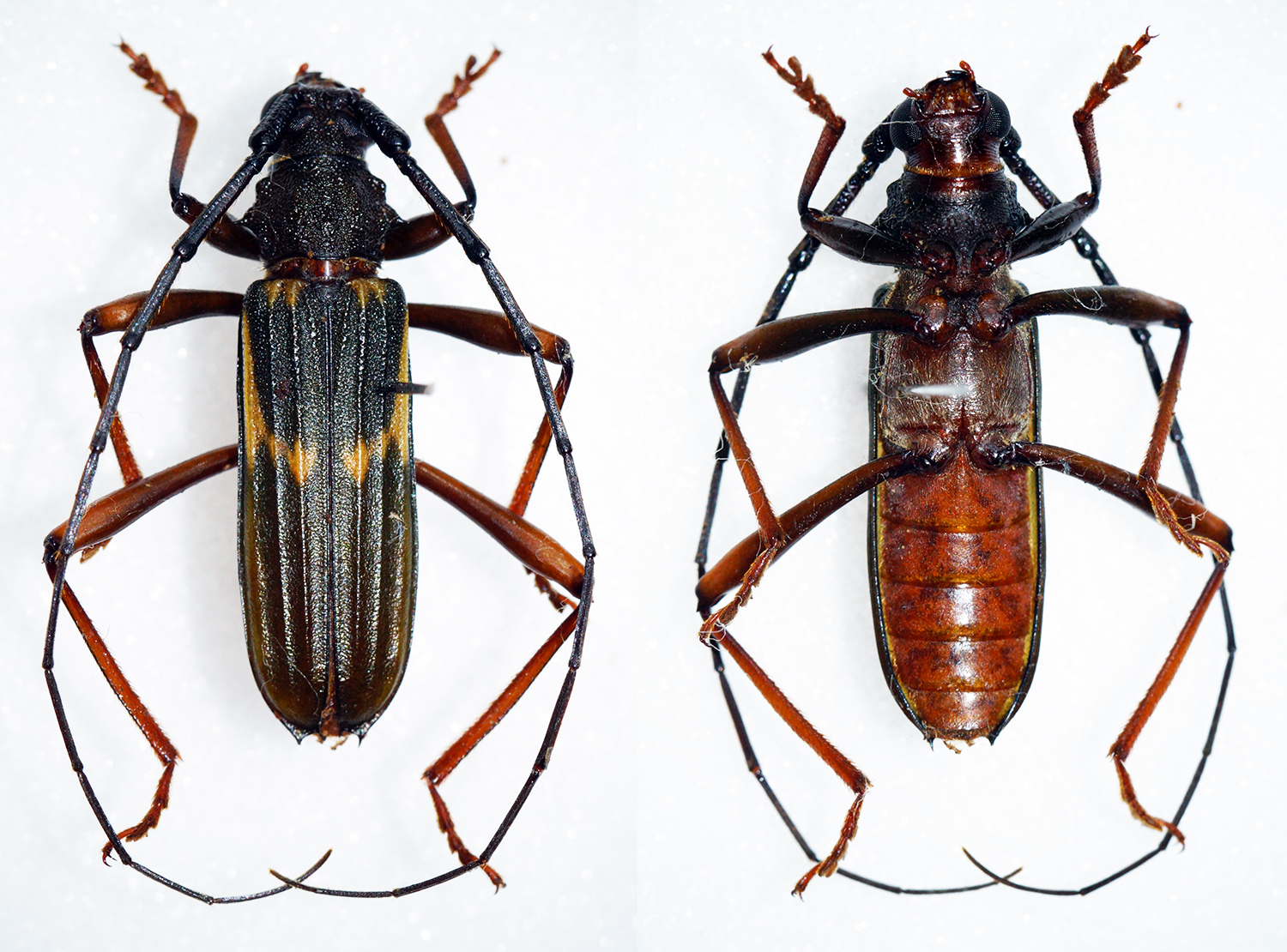

Scientific classification
- Kingdom: Animalia
- Phylum: Arthropoda
- Clade: Pancrustacea
- Class: Insecta
- Order: Coleoptera
- Suborder: Polyphaga
- Infraorder: Cucujiformia
- Family: Cerambycidae
- Genus: Chlorida
- Species: C. denticulata

Binomial name
- Chlorida denticulata Buquet, 1860

= Chlorida denticulata =

Species of beetle

Chlorida denticulata is a species of beetle in the family Cerambycidae. It was described by Buquet in 1860. Its known distribution is in Guyana, French Guiana, and Ecuador. Known host plants include Eperua rubiginosa, Ormosia paraensis, and Hevea guianensis.
