= John Bachmann =

Swiss-American lithographer (1817-1899)

- Born: January 31, 1817
- Died: May 22, 1899 (aged 82)
- Notable work: bird's-eye views of New York City
- Style: lithography

John Bachmann, Sr. (January 31, 1817 – May 22, 1899) was a Swiss-born lithographer and artist best known for his bird's-eye views, especially of New York City.

== Career ==
He was a journeyman lithographic artist in Switzerland and Paris until 1847. His first known American print (credited to "C Bachmann" as artist and "J Bachmann" as publisher) appeared in 1848, a view from an imagined point above Union Square in New York, looking south toward The Battery. In 1849 and 1850, he created and published a series of American views, including views of Boston, New York, Philadelphia, New Orleans and Havana. Both directly copied and used as a primary source by other lithographers at home and in Europe, these were the first major bird's eye views (drawn from an imagined perspective), as opposed to panoramic views (views drawn directly from the artists experience) in the United States (smaller views had appeared as early as the 1820s).

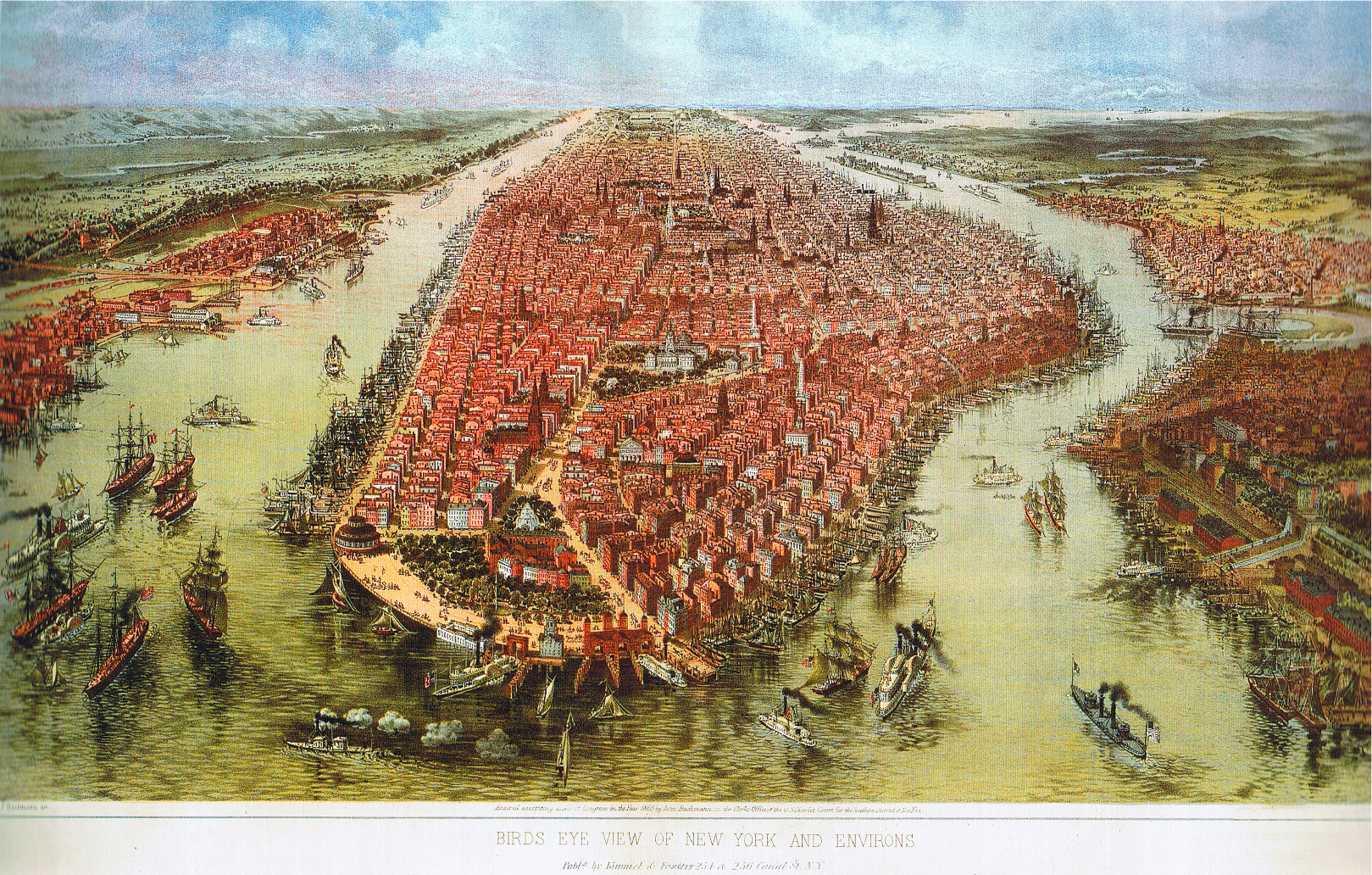
Birds Eye View of New York and Environs

Although best known for his views of New York, his name is attached to a variety of prints, including the well-known "Bird's Eye View of the Seat of War" series produced during the American Civil War, which show the theater of war in six sections, each a perspective view of entire states or sets of states.

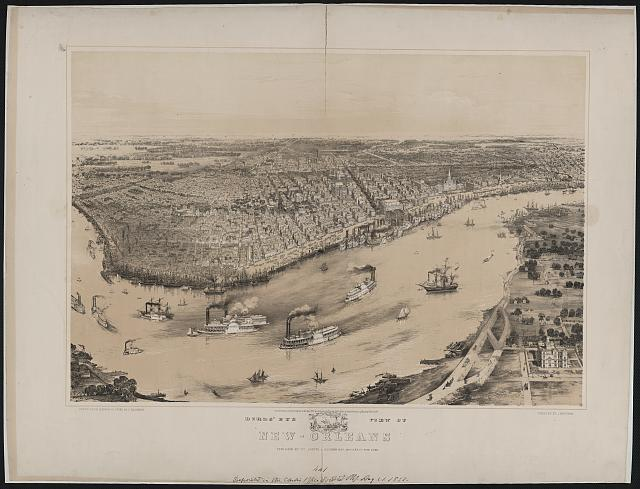
John Bachmann, Bird's Eye View of New Orleans, 1851 (Library of Congress)

Bachmann married twice, having 5 children with his first wife, 4 for whom were born in Switzerland, and one in Brooklyn, NY and had then four children with his second wife (Eliza), the eldest of whom, John Bachmann, Jr. also became a lithographer. Except for two brief sojourns in Philadelphia, he appears to have remained in the Heights neighborhood of Jersey City from the late 1850s until his death in 1899. Most of his views of New York City manage to sneak in his home neighborhood in Jersey City. His last known work, a view of Havana, is now in the collection of the Library of Congress. The one other known painting by Bachmann, a version of one of his views of Philadelphia, hangs in the Free Library of Philadelphia. He immigrated to New York on 6 Nov. 1848 with his first wife and one surviving child from his first wife (Anna) on the ship Lady Arabella.

== Sources ==
- Reps, John (1984) Views and Viewmakers of Urban America: Lithographs of Towns and Cities in the United States and Canada, notes on the artists and publishers, and a union catalog of their work, 1825 – 1925. University of Missouri Press, 1984, particularly the biography of Bachmann, page 160.
- Case, Nat (2008) "John Bachmann and the American Bird's Eye View Print", Imprint, volume 33, No 2 (Autumn 2008).
