= Estación Tacañitas =

Coordinates: 28°37′S 62°36′W

- Municipality and village
- Interactive map of Estación Tacañitas
- Country: Argentina
- Province: Santiago del Estero
- Time zone: UTC−3 (ART)

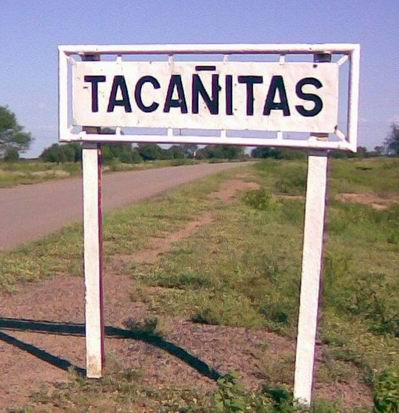
Estación Tacañitas

Estación Tacañitas is a municipality and village in Santiago del Estero in Argentina.
