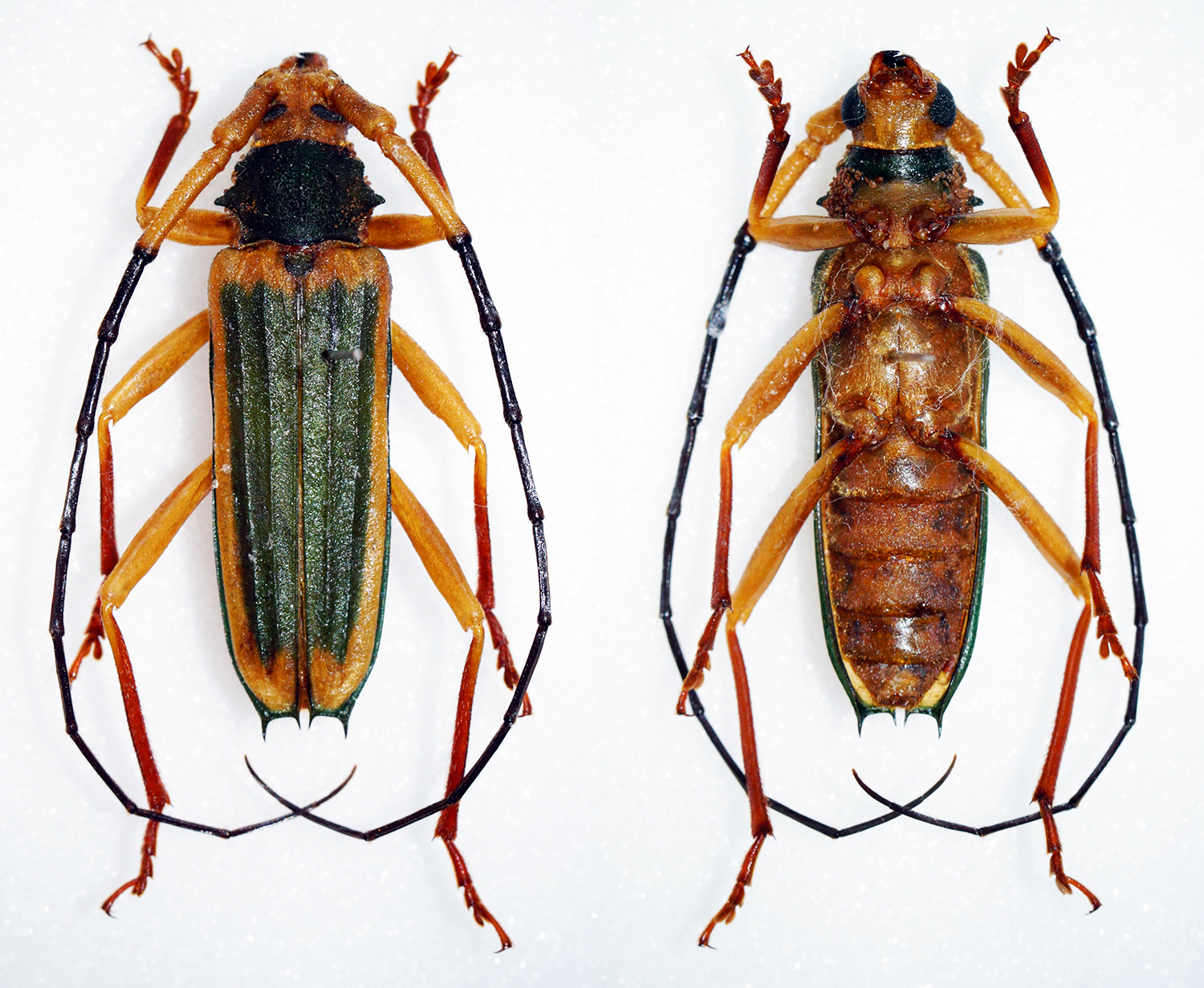

Scientific classification
- Kingdom: Animalia
- Phylum: Arthropoda
- Clade: Pancrustacea
- Class: Insecta
- Order: Coleoptera
- Suborder: Polyphaga
- Infraorder: Cucujiformia
- Family: Cerambycidae
- Genus: Chlorida
- Species: C. cincta

Binomial name
- Chlorida cincta Guérin-Méneville, 1844

= Chlorida cincta =

Species of beetle

Chlorida cincta is a species of beetle in the family Cerambycidae. It was described by Félix Édouard Guérin-Méneville in 1844.

== Distribution ==
It is found in Colombia, Costa Rica, El Salvador, Ecuador, Guatemala, Honduras, México, Nicaragua and Panamá.
