= Chlorida costata =

Scientific classification
- Domain: Eukaryota
- Kingdom: Animalia
- Phylum: Arthropoda
- Class: Insecta
- Order: Coleoptera
- Suborder: Polyphaga
- Infraorder: Cucujiformia
- Family: Cerambycidae
- Genus: Chlorida
- Species: C. costata

Binomial name
- Chlorida costata Audinet-Serville, 1834

Species of beetle

Chlorida costata is a species of beetle in the family Cerambycidae. It was described by Audinet-Serville in 1834. It is known from southeastern Brazil, Paraguay, Argentina, and Uruguay.
