= 1817 Santiago del Estero earthquake =

Earthquake in Argentina

The 1817 Santiago del Estero earthquake took place in the province of Santiago del Estero, Argentina, on 4 July at about 05:30 p.m. It was estimated to be 7.0 on the Richter scale. Its epicenter was at 28°00′S 64°30′W, at a depth of 30 km.

The earthquake was felt with grade VIII on the Mercalli intensity scale in the provincial capital Santiago del Estero, where it caused grave damage.
