= Pierre-Émile Gounelle =

French entomologist

Pierre-Émile Gounelle (Paris, 9 June 1850 – 2 October 1914, Paris) was a French entomologist and naturalist.

Son of engineer, Eugène Gounelle, who installed the first telegraph line from Paris via Rouen to Le Havre, Pierre-Émile also trained first as an engineer. From 1884 he made several scientific expeditions to Brazil. He is chiefly remembered for his investigations of Cerambycidae found in Brazil. He bequeathed his entomological books to the Société Entomologique de France.

In Brazil, he collected plants that later became part of the herbarium at the Muséum national d'histoire naturelle. The botanical species – Barbacenia gounelleana, Leiothrix gounelleana, Pilosocereus gounellei and Pseudopilocereus gounellei are named after him.

== Publications ==
- Liste des cérambycides de la région de Jatahy, État de Goyaz, Brésil, Annales de la Société Entomologique de France, Paris 80: 1-150 (1911).
