= Jean Baptiste Lucien Buquet =

French entomologist and insect dealer (1807–1889)

Jean Baptiste Lucien Buquet (4 March 1807, Dieuze –14 December 1889, Paris) was a French entomologist and insect dealer mainly interested in Coleoptera. He described many new genera and species. Buquet's business dealt in exotic Coleoptera, especially Buprestidae, Lucanidae, Scarabaeidae and Cerambycidae. He also sold Lepidoptera, especially Morpho and Agrias. The insects came mainly from the French colonial empires. He was a member of the Société entomologique de France.

The beetle family Lucanidae was named after him. His collection was purchased by the Natural History Museum in London.

== Works ==
Partial list

- Description de onze espèces nouvelles du genre Lebia; rapportées de Cayenne par M. Leprieur. Annales de la Société Entomologique de France 3: 673-681 (1834).
- 1835. Description d´un Coléoptére nouveau, du genre Goliathus (de Lamarck). Annales de la Société Entomologique de France 1835 4: 135-137 (1835).
- Annales de la Société Entomologique de France 1836 5: 201-207 (1836).
- Description d'une nouvelle espéce de Buprestide du genre Polybothris. Annales de la Société Entomologique de France (3) 2: 75-76 (1854)
- 1859. Mémoire sur deux genres nouveaux de coléoptèresde la famille des longicornes (Oxilus et Sthelenus), suivi de la description de plusieurs espèces appartenant aux genres Platyarthron, Oeme (Sclerocerus Dej.), Clytus, Apriona, Cerosterna et Acanthoderus. Annales de la Société Entomologique de France, Paris, 7 (3): 619-636 (1859)
