= Compsibidion capixaba =

Scientific classification
- Kingdom: Animalia
- Phylum: Arthropoda
- Class: Insecta
- Order: Coleoptera
- Suborder: Polyphaga
- Infraorder: Cucujiformia
- Family: Cerambycidae
- Genus: Compsibidion
- Species: C. capixaba

Binomial name
- Compsibidion capixaba (Martins, 1962)

Species of beetle

Compsibidion capixaba is a species of beetle in the family Cerambycidae. It was described by Brazilian entomologist Ubirajara Martins in 1962.
