= Minibidion unifasciatum =

Scientific classification
- Domain: Eukaryota
- Kingdom: Animalia
- Phylum: Arthropoda
- Class: Insecta
- Order: Coleoptera
- Suborder: Polyphaga
- Infraorder: Cucujiformia
- Family: Cerambycidae
- Genus: Minibidion
- Species: M. unifasciatum

Binomial name
- Minibidion unifasciatum Martins & Galileo, 2007

Species of beetle

Minibidion unifasciatum is a species of beetle in the family Cerambycidae. It was described by Ubirajara Ribeiro Martins and Maria Helena M. Galileo in 2007. The holotype was deposited in the Noel Kempff Mercado Natural History Museum, Universidad Autónoma Gabriel René Moreno in Santa Cruz de la Sierra, Bolivia.
