= Neopalame atromaculata =

Scientific classification
- Kingdom: Animalia
- Phylum: Arthropoda
- Clade: Pancrustacea
- Class: Insecta
- Order: Coleoptera
- Suborder: Polyphaga
- Infraorder: Cucujiformia
- Family: Cerambycidae
- Genus: Neopalame
- Species: N. atromaculata

Binomial name
- Neopalame atromaculata Monné & Martins, 1976

Species of beetle

Neopalame atromaculata is a species of beetle in the family Cerambycidae. It was described by Miguel Angel Monné and Ubirajara Ribeiro Martins in 1976. It occurs in eastern Brazil (Bahia, Espírito Santo, Rio de Janeiro, São Paulo, Paraná, Rio Grande do Sul).

Neopalame atromaculata measure 12.4–14.2 mm (0.49–0.56 in) in length.
