= C. inornatum =

C. inornatum may refer to:

- Chlorophytum inornatum, a flowering plant species
- Compsibidion inornatum, a beetle species
