= Neopalame albomaculata =

Scientific classification
- Kingdom: Animalia
- Phylum: Arthropoda
- Clade: Pancrustacea
- Class: Insecta
- Order: Coleoptera
- Suborder: Polyphaga
- Infraorder: Cucujiformia
- Family: Cerambycidae
- Genus: Neopalame
- Species: N. albomaculata

Binomial name
- Neopalame albomaculata Monné & Martins, 1976

Species of beetle

Neopalame albomaculata is a species of beetle in the family Cerambycidae. It was described by Miguel Angel Monné and Ubirajara Ribeiro Martins in 1976. It occurs in central-eastern Peru (Departments of Junin and Madre de Dios) and eastern Brazil (Paraná).

Neopalame albomaculata measure 8.2–14.2 mm (0.32–0.56 in) in length.
