= Compsibidion carenatum =

Scientific classification
- Kingdom: Animalia
- Phylum: Arthropoda
- Class: Insecta
- Order: Coleoptera
- Suborder: Polyphaga
- Infraorder: Cucujiformia
- Family: Cerambycidae
- Genus: Compsibidion
- Species: C. carenatum

Binomial name
- Compsibidion carenatum Martins, 1969

Species of beetle

Compsibidion carenatum is a species of beetle in the family Cerambycidae. It was described by Brazilian entomologist Ubirajara Martins in 1969.
