= Neopalame =

Scientific classification
- Kingdom: Animalia
- Phylum: Arthropoda
- Clade: Pancrustacea
- Class: Insecta
- Order: Coleoptera
- Suborder: Polyphaga
- Infraorder: Cucujiformia
- Family: Cerambycidae
- Tribe: Acanthocinini
- Genus: Neopalame; Martins & Monné, 1972

Species
- See text

Genus of beetles

Neopalame is a genus of beetles in the family Cerambycidae. It is known from South America, with records from Brazil, French Guiana, and Peru.

== Species ==
The genus includes the following species:

- Neopalame albida Monné, 1985
- Neopalame albomaculata Monné & Martins, 1976
- Neopalame atromaculata Monné & Martins, 1976
- Neopalame cretata Monné & Delfino, 1980
- Neopalame deludens Monné, 1985
- Neopalame digna (Melzer, 1935)
