= Delemodacrys =

Delemodacrys mourei

Scientific classification
- Kingdom: Animalia
- Phylum: Arthropoda
- Class: Insecta
- Order: Coleoptera
- Suborder: Polyphaga
- Infraorder: Cucujiformia
- Family: Cerambycidae
- Genus: Delemodacrys
- Species: D. mourei

Binomial name
- Delemodacrys mourei Martins & Napp, 1979

Genus of beetle

Delemodacrys mourei is a species of beetle in the family Cerambycidae, the only species in the genus Delemodacrys.

The species was first described by Ubirajara Ribeiro Martins and Dilma Solange Napp in 1979. It is found in French Guiana and the Brazilian states of Pará, Amapá, and Amazonas.
