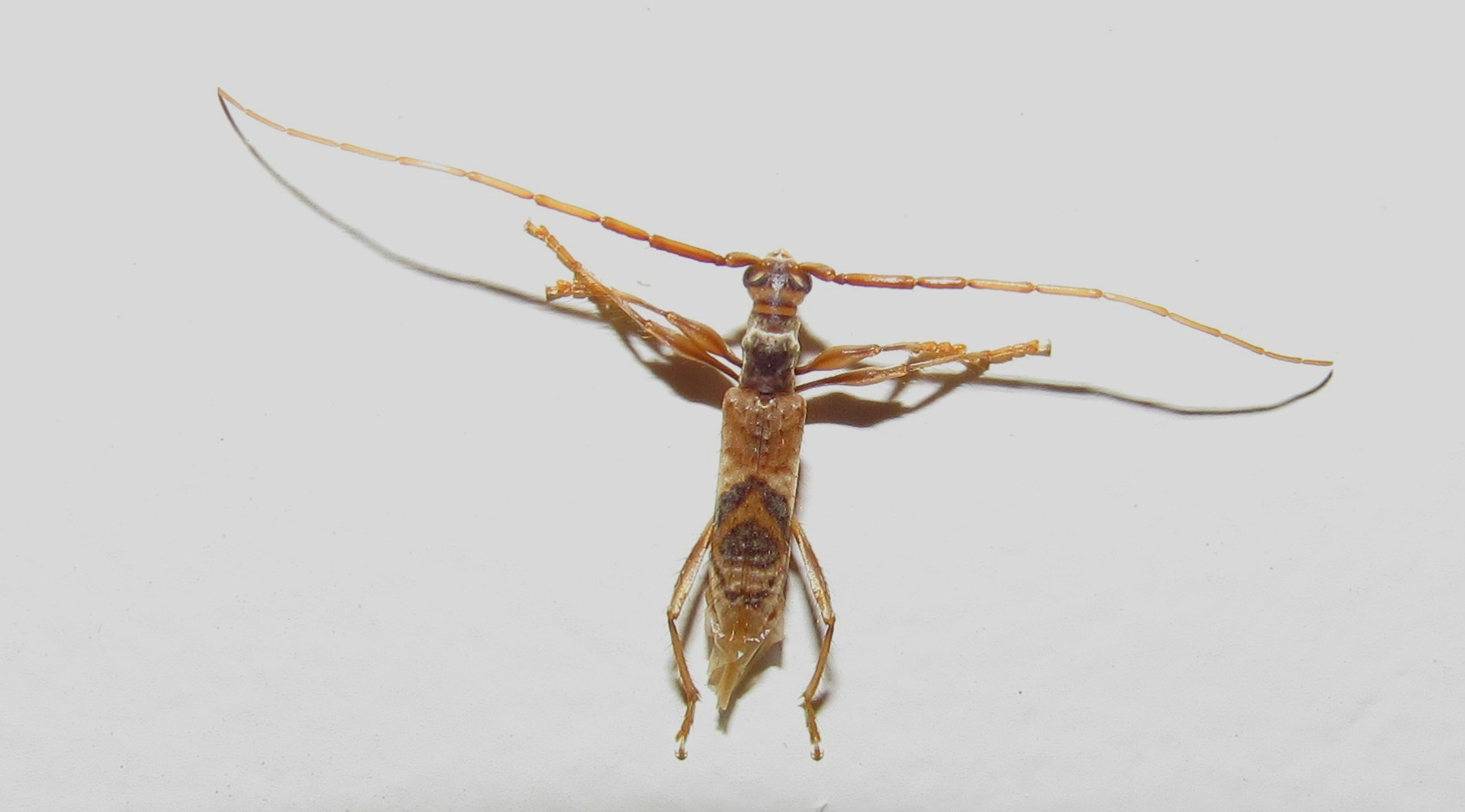

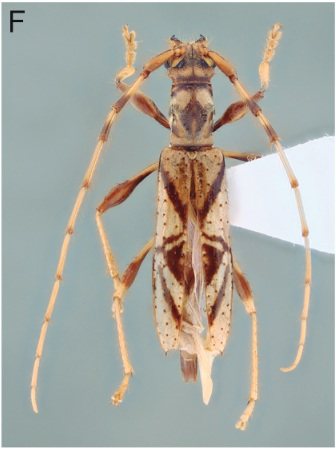

Scientific classification
- Kingdom: Animalia
- Phylum: Arthropoda
- Clade: Pancrustacea
- Class: Insecta
- Order: Coleoptera
- Suborder: Polyphaga
- Infraorder: Cucujiformia
- Family: Cerambycidae
- Genus: Compsibidion
- Species: C. vanum

Binomial name
- Compsibidion vanum (Thomson, 1867)

Synonyms
- Ibidion (Compsibidion) vanum Thomson, 1867; Compsa histrionica Bates, 1870

= Compsibidion vanum =

Species of beetle

Compsibidion vanum is a species of beetle in the family Cerambycidae. It was described by Thomson in 1867. It is found in Mexico (Jalisco, Veracruz, Chiapas, Tabasco), Guatemala, El Salvador, Nicaragua, Costa Rica, Panama, Ecuador, Venezuela, Guyana, French Guiana, Peru, Brazil (Amazonas, Pará, Mato Grosso, Mato Grosso do Sul, Goiás, Maranhão, Alagoas, Ceará, Bahia, Minas Gerais, Espirito Santo, Rio de Janeiro, São Paulo, Paraná, Santa Catarina, Rio Grande do Sul), Paraguay and Argentina.
