= Compsibidion maculatum =

Scientific classification
- Kingdom: Animalia
- Phylum: Arthropoda
- Class: Insecta
- Order: Coleoptera
- Suborder: Polyphaga
- Infraorder: Cucujiformia
- Family: Cerambycidae
- Genus: Compsibidion
- Species: C. maculatum

Binomial name
- Compsibidion maculatum Martins, Galileo & Oliveira, 2011

Species of beetle

Compsibidion maculatum is a species of beetle in the family Cerambycidae. It was described by Martins, Galileo and Oliveira in 2011.
