= Minibidion aquilonium =

Scientific classification
- Kingdom: Animalia
- Phylum: Arthropoda
- Class: Insecta
- Order: Coleoptera
- Suborder: Polyphaga
- Infraorder: Cucujiformia
- Family: Cerambycidae
- Genus: Minibidion
- Species: M. aquilonium

Binomial name
- Minibidion aquilonium Martins, 1968

Species of beetle

Minibidion aquilonium is a species of beetle in the family Cerambycidae. It was described by Martins in 1968.
