= Compsibidion basale =

Scientific classification
- Kingdom: Animalia
- Phylum: Arthropoda
- Class: Insecta
- Order: Coleoptera
- Suborder: Polyphaga
- Infraorder: Cucujiformia
- Family: Cerambycidae
- Genus: Compsibidion
- Species: C. basale

Binomial name
- Compsibidion basale (White, 1855)

Species of beetle

Compsibidion basale is a species of beetle in the family Cerambycidae. It was described by White in 1855.
