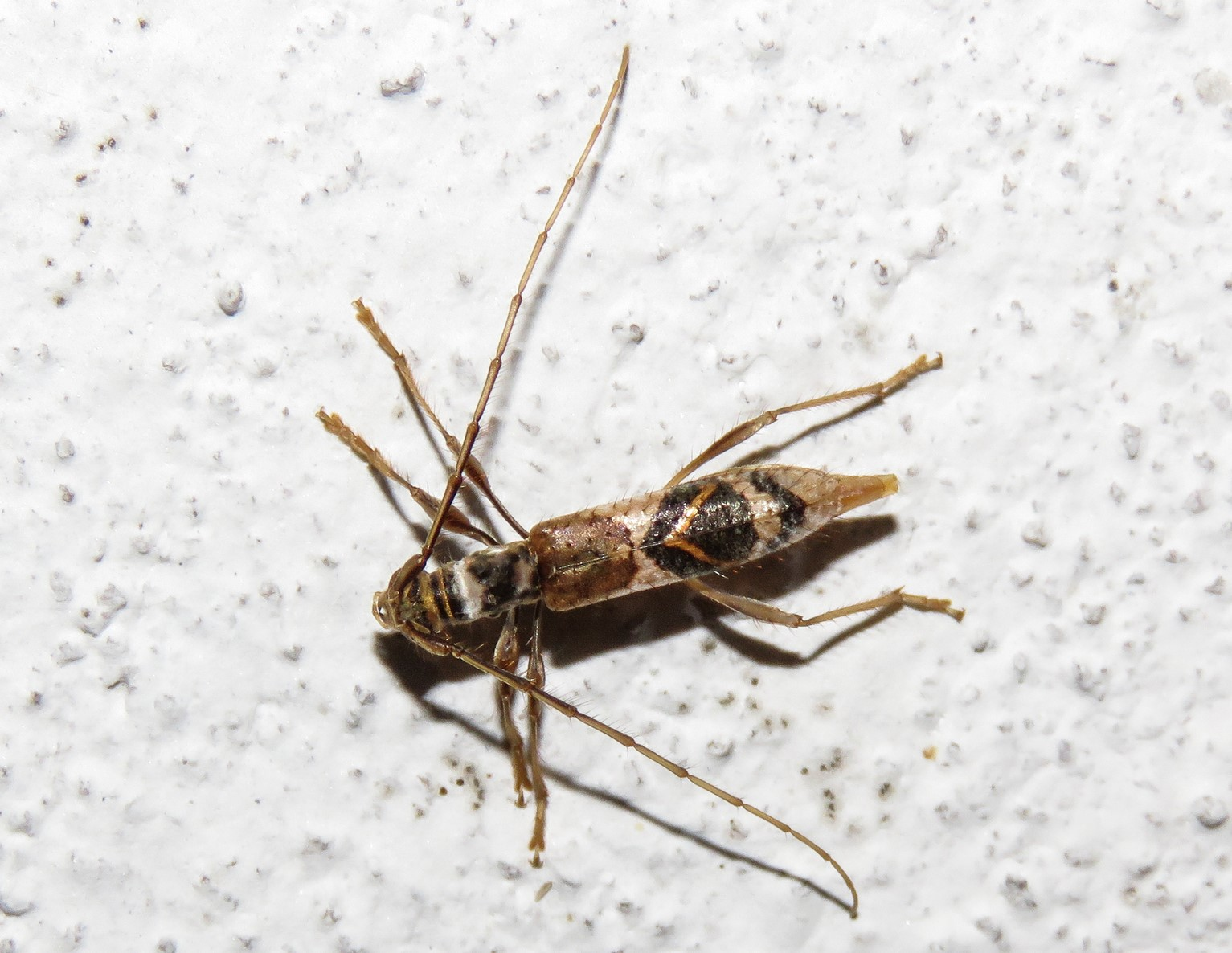

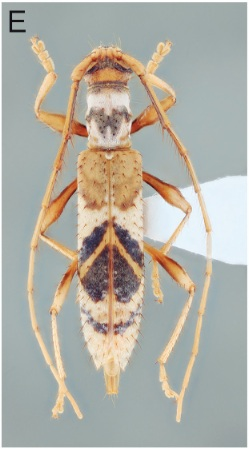

Scientific classification
- Kingdom: Animalia
- Phylum: Arthropoda
- Clade: Pancrustacea
- Class: Insecta
- Order: Coleoptera
- Suborder: Polyphaga
- Infraorder: Cucujiformia
- Family: Cerambycidae
- Genus: Compsibidion
- Species: C. sommeri

Binomial name
- Compsibidion sommeri (Thomson, 1865)

Synonyms
- Ibidion sommeri Thomson, 1865

= Compsibidion sommeri =

Species of beetle

Compsibidion sommeri is a species of beetle in the family Cerambycidae. It was described by Thomson in 1865. It is found in Bolivia, Brazil (Goiás, Bahia, Minas Gerais, Espirito Santo, Rio de Janeiro, São Paulo, Paraná, Santa Catarina) and Argentina.
