= Minibidion bicolor =

Scientific classification
- Kingdom: Animalia
- Phylum: Arthropoda
- Class: Insecta
- Order: Coleoptera
- Suborder: Polyphaga
- Infraorder: Cucujiformia
- Family: Cerambycidae
- Genus: Minibidion
- Species: M. bicolor

Binomial name
- Minibidion bicolor Martins, Galileo & de-Oliveira, 2009

Species of beetle

Minibidion bicolor is a species of beetle in the family Cerambycidae. It was described by Martins, Galileo and de-Oliveira in 2009.
