= Neopalame deludens =

Scientific classification
- Kingdom: Animalia
- Phylum: Arthropoda
- Clade: Pancrustacea
- Class: Insecta
- Order: Coleoptera
- Suborder: Polyphaga
- Infraorder: Cucujiformia
- Family: Cerambycidae
- Genus: Neopalame
- Species: N. deludens

Binomial name
- Neopalame deludens Monné, 1985

Species of beetle

Neopalame deludens is a species of beetle in the family Cerambycidae. It was described by Miguel Angel Monné in 1985. It occurs in Rondônia and Mato Grosso, Center West/North Brazil.

Neopalame deludens measure 13 mm (0.51 in) in length.
