= Compsibidion trinidadense =

Scientific classification
- Kingdom: Animalia
- Phylum: Arthropoda
- Class: Insecta
- Order: Coleoptera
- Suborder: Polyphaga
- Infraorder: Cucujiformia
- Family: Cerambycidae
- Genus: Compsibidion
- Species: C. trinidadense

Binomial name
- Compsibidion trinidadense (Gilmour, 1963)

Species of beetle

Compsibidion trinidadense is a species of beetle in the family Cerambycidae. It was described by Gilmour in 1963.
