= Compsibidion callispilum =

Scientific classification
- Kingdom: Animalia
- Phylum: Arthropoda
- Class: Insecta
- Order: Coleoptera
- Suborder: Polyphaga
- Infraorder: Cucujiformia
- Family: Cerambycidae
- Genus: Compsibidion
- Species: C. callispilum

Binomial name
- Compsibidion callispilum (Bates, 1870)

Species of beetle

Compsibidion callispilum is a species of beetle in the family Cerambycidae. It was described by Bates in 1870.
