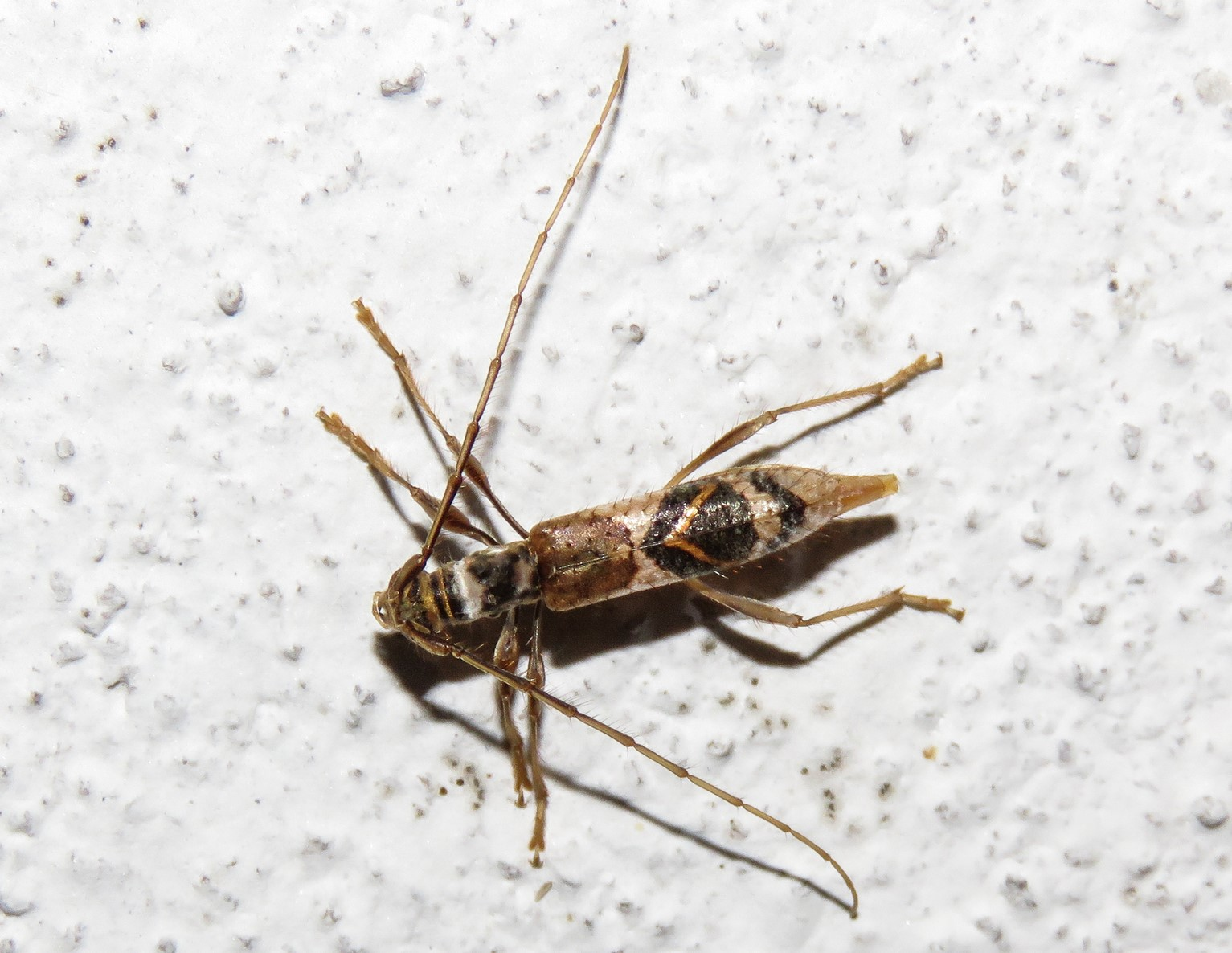

Scientific classification
- Kingdom: Animalia
- Phylum: Arthropoda
- Class: Insecta
- Order: Coleoptera
- Suborder: Polyphaga
- Infraorder: Cucujiformia
- Family: Cerambycidae
- Subfamily: Cerambycinae
- Tribe: Ibidionini
- Genus: Compsibidion; Thomson, 1864

= Compsibidion =

Genus of beetles

Compsibidion is a genus of beetles in the family Cerambycidae, containing the following species:

- Compsibidion aegrotum (Bates, 1870)
- Compsibidion amantei (Martins, 1960)
- Compsibidion angulare (Thomson, 1867)
- Compsibidion balium Napp & Martins, 1985
- Compsibidion basale (White, 1855)
- Compsibidion callispilum (Bates, 1870)
- Compsibidion campestre (Gounelle, 1909)
- Compsibidion capixaba (Martins, 1962)
- Compsibidion carenatum Martins, 1969
- Compsibidion charile (Bates, 1870)
- Compsibidion circunflexum Martins, 1971
- Compsibidion cleophile (Thomson, 1865)
- Compsibidion clivum Martins, 1971
- Compsibidion concisum Napp & Martins, 1985
- Compsibidion crassipede Martins, 1971
- Compsibidion decemmaculatum (Martins, 1960)
- Compsibidion decoratum (Gounelle, 1909)
- Compsibidion derivativum Martins, 1971
- Compsibidion divisum Martins, 1969
- Compsibidion fairmairei (Thomson, 1865)
- Compsibidion graphicum (Thomson, 1867)
- Compsibidion guanabarinum (Martins, 1962)
- Compsibidion ilium (Thomson, 1864)
- Compsibidion inornatum (Martins, 1962)
- Compsibidion litturatum (Martins, 1960)
- Compsibidion maculatum Martins, Galileo & Oliveira, 2011
- Compsibidion maronicum (Thomson, 1867)
- Compsibidion megarthron (Martins, 1962)
- Compsibidion melancholicum Martins, 1969
- Compsibidion meridionale Martins, 1969
- Compsibidion monnei Martins, 1969
- Compsibidion multizonatum Martins, 1969
- Compsibidion muricatum Martins, 1971
- Compsibidion mysticum Martins, 1969
- Compsibidion nigroterminatum (Martins, 1965)
- Compsibidion niveum (Martins, 1962)
- Compsibidion omissum Martins, 1969
- Compsibidion orpa (White, 1855)
- Compsibidion paradoxum Martins, 1971
- Compsibidion paulista (Martins, 1962)
- Compsibidion polyzonum (Bates, 1870)
- Compsibidion psydrum Martins, 1969
- Compsibidion pumilium Martins & Galileo, 1999
- Compsibidion punga Martins & Galileo, 2007
- Compsibidion quadrisignatum (Thomson, 1865)
- Compsibidion reichardti (Martins, 1962)
- Compsibidion rutha (White, 1855)
- Compsibidion simillimum Martins, 1969
- Compsibidion singulare (Gounelle, 1909)
- Compsibidion sommeri (Thomson, 1865)
- Compsibidion sphaeriinum (Bates, 1870)
- Compsibidion taperu Martins & Galileo, 2007
- Compsibidion tethys (Thomson, 1867)
- Compsibidion thoracicum (White, 1855)
- Compsibidion trichocerum (Martins, 1962)
- Compsibidion trinidadense (Gilmour, 1963)
- Compsibidion triviale Napp & Martins, 1985
- Compsibidion truncatum (Thomson, 1865)
- Compsibidion tuberosum Martins, 1971
- Compsibidion unifasciatum (Gounelle, 1909)
- Compsibidion uniforme Galileo & Martins, 2011
- Compsibidion vanum (Thomson, 1867)
- Compsibidion varipenne Martins, 1969
- Compsibidion virgatum Martins, 1969
- Compsibidion ytu Martins, Galileo & Oliveira, 2011
- Compsibidion zikani (Melzer, 1933)
