= Neopalame digna =

Scientific classification
- Kingdom: Animalia
- Phylum: Arthropoda
- Clade: Pancrustacea
- Class: Insecta
- Order: Coleoptera
- Suborder: Polyphaga
- Infraorder: Cucujiformia
- Family: Cerambycidae
- Genus: Neopalame
- Species: N. digna

Binomial name
- Neopalame digna (Melzer, 1935)

Synonyms
- Eutrypanus dignus Melzer, 1935; Neopalame dignus (Melzer, 1935)

Species of beetle

Neopalame digna is a species of beetle in the family Cerambycidae. It was described by Julius Melzer in 1935. It occurs in Southeast Brazil (Minas Gerais, Espírito Santo, and Rio de Janeiro).

Neopalame digna measure 12–13.5 mm (0.47–0.53 in) in length.
