= Compsibidion quadrisignatum =

Scientific classification
- Kingdom: Animalia
- Phylum: Arthropoda
- Class: Insecta
- Order: Coleoptera
- Suborder: Polyphaga
- Infraorder: Cucujiformia
- Family: Cerambycidae
- Genus: Compsibidion
- Species: C. quadrisignatum

Binomial name
- Compsibidion quadrisignatum (Thomson, 1865)

Species of beetle

Compsibidion quadrisignatum is a species of beetle in the family Cerambycidae. It was described by Thomson in 1865.
