= Minibidion =

Scientific classification
- Kingdom: Animalia
- Phylum: Arthropoda
- Class: Insecta
- Order: Coleoptera
- Suborder: Polyphaga
- Infraorder: Cucujiformia
- Family: Cerambycidae
- Genus: Minibidion

Genus of beetles

Minibidion is a genus of beetles in the family Cerambycidae, containing the following species:

- Minibidion aquilonium Martins, 1968
- Minibidion argenteum Martins & Napp, 1986
- Minibidion basilare (Martins, 1962)
- Minibidion bicolor Martins, Galileo & de-Oliveira, 2009
- Minibidion bondari (Melzer, 1923)
- Minibidion confine Martins, 1968
- Minibidion craspedum Martins, 1971
- Minibidion minimum Martins & Napp, 1986
- Minibidion minusculum (Martins, 1962)
- Minibidion perfectum Martins & Galileo, 2011
- Minibidion punctipenne Martins, 1968
- Minibidion rurigena (Gounelle, 1909)
- Minibidion tricolor Martins & Galileo, 2007
- Minibidion unifasciatum Martins & Galileo, 2007
