= Neopalame albida =

Scientific classification
- Kingdom: Animalia
- Phylum: Arthropoda
- Clade: Pancrustacea
- Class: Insecta
- Order: Coleoptera
- Suborder: Polyphaga
- Infraorder: Cucujiformia
- Family: Cerambycidae
- Genus: Neopalame
- Species: N. albida

Binomial name
- Neopalame albida Monné, 1985

Species of beetle

Neopalame albida is a species of beetle in the family Cerambycidae. It was described by Miguel Angel Monné in 1985. It occurs in Espírito Santo, Southeast Brazil.

Neopalame albida measure 9–11 mm (0.35–0.43 in) in length.
