= Minibidion tricolor =

Scientific classification
- Kingdom: Animalia
- Phylum: Arthropoda
- Class: Insecta
- Order: Coleoptera
- Suborder: Polyphaga
- Infraorder: Cucujiformia
- Family: Cerambycidae
- Genus: Minibidion
- Species: M. tricolor

Binomial name
- Minibidion tricolor Martins & Galileo, 2007

Species of beetle

Minibidion tricolor is a species of beetle in the family Cerambycidae. It was described by Martins and Galileo in 2007.
