= Neopalame cretata =

Scientific classification
- Kingdom: Animalia
- Phylum: Arthropoda
- Clade: Pancrustacea
- Class: Insecta
- Order: Coleoptera
- Suborder: Polyphaga
- Infraorder: Cucujiformia
- Family: Cerambycidae
- Genus: Neopalame
- Species: N. cretata

Binomial name
- Neopalame cretata Monné & Delfino, 1980

Species of beetle

Neopalame cretata is a species of beetle in the family Cerambycidae. It occurs in central and northern Brazil and in French Guiana.

Neopalame cretata measure 10.5–13.2 mm (0.41–0.52 in) in length.
