= Compsibidion virgatum =

Scientific classification
- Kingdom: Animalia
- Phylum: Arthropoda
- Class: Insecta
- Order: Coleoptera
- Suborder: Polyphaga
- Infraorder: Cucujiformia
- Family: Cerambycidae
- Genus: Compsibidion
- Species: C. virgatum

Binomial name
- Compsibidion virgatum Martins, 1969

Species of beetle

Compsibidion virgatum is a species of beetle in the family Cerambycidae. It was described by Martins in 1969.
