= Compsibidion decemmaculatum =

Scientific classification
- Kingdom: Animalia
- Phylum: Arthropoda
- Class: Insecta
- Order: Coleoptera
- Suborder: Polyphaga
- Infraorder: Cucujiformia
- Family: Cerambycidae
- Genus: Compsibidion
- Species: C. decemmaculatum

Binomial name
- Compsibidion decemmaculatum (Martins, 1960)

Species of beetle

Compsibidion decemmaculatum is a species of beetle in the family Cerambycidae. It was described by Martins in 1960.
