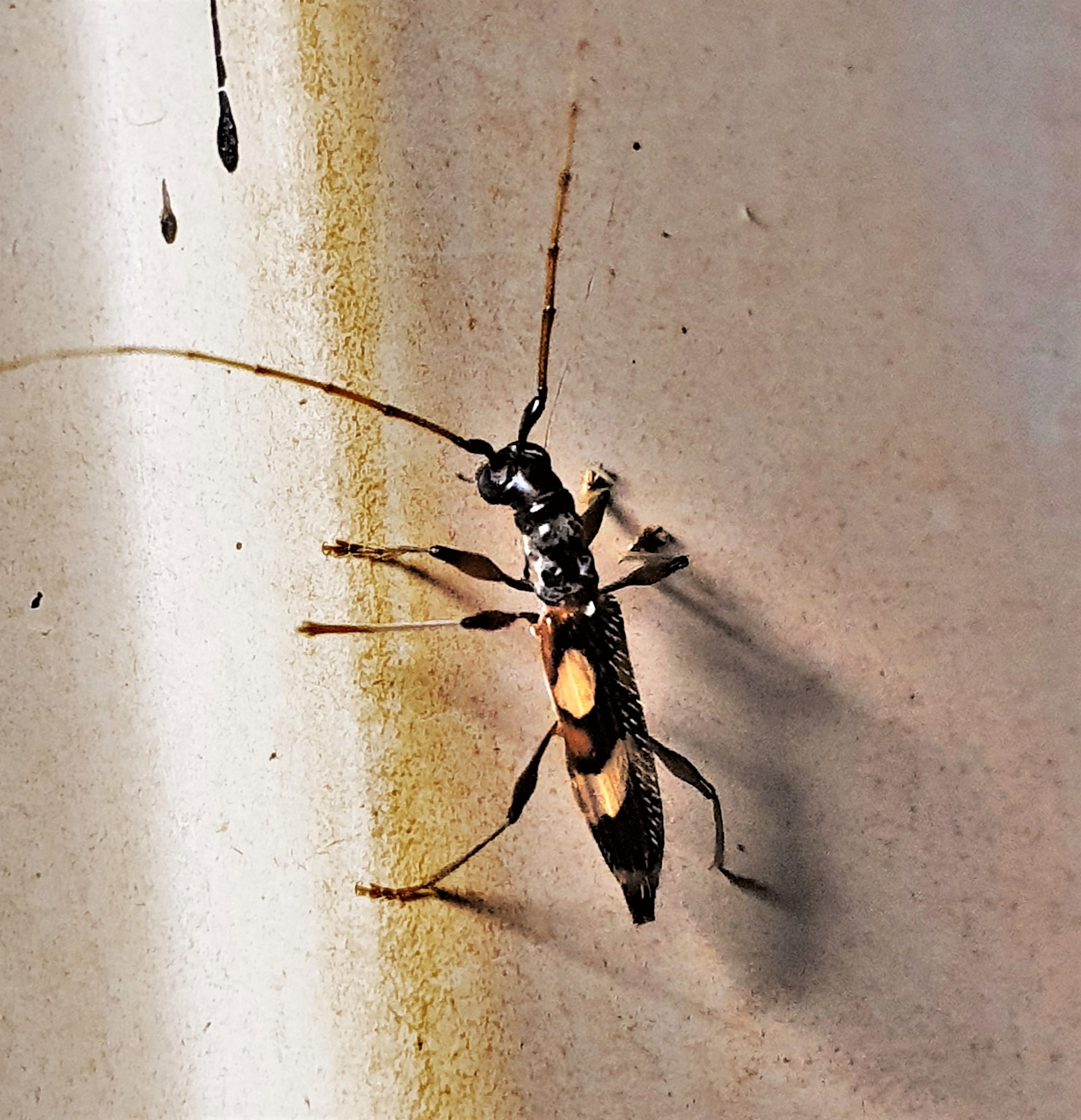

Scientific classification
- Kingdom: Animalia
- Phylum: Arthropoda
- Class: Insecta
- Order: Coleoptera
- Suborder: Polyphaga
- Infraorder: Cucujiformia
- Family: Cerambycidae
- Genus: Compsibidion
- Species: C. maronicum

Binomial name
- Compsibidion maronicum (Thomson, 1867)

= Compsibidion maronicum =

Species of beetle

Compsibidion maronicum is a species of beetle in the family Cerambycidae. It was described by Thomson in 1867.
