= Compsibidion aegrotum =

Scientific classification
- Kingdom: Animalia
- Phylum: Arthropoda
- Class: Insecta
- Order: Coleoptera
- Suborder: Polyphaga
- Infraorder: Cucujiformia
- Family: Cerambycidae
- Genus: Compsibidion
- Species: C. aegrotum

Binomial name
- Compsibidion aegrotum (Bates, 1870)

Species of beetle

Compsibidion aegrotum is a species of beetle in the family Cerambycidae. It was described by Bates in 1870.
