= Minibidion perfectum =

Scientific classification
- Kingdom: Animalia
- Phylum: Arthropoda
- Class: Insecta
- Order: Coleoptera
- Suborder: Polyphaga
- Infraorder: Cucujiformia
- Family: Cerambycidae
- Genus: Minibidion
- Species: M. perfectum

Binomial name
- Minibidion perfectum Martins & Galileo, 2011

Species of beetle

Minibidion perfectum is a species of beetle in the family Cerambycidae. It was described by Martins and Galileo in 2011.
