= Compsibidion nigroterminatum =

Scientific classification
- Kingdom: Animalia
- Phylum: Arthropoda
- Class: Insecta
- Order: Coleoptera
- Suborder: Polyphaga
- Infraorder: Cucujiformia
- Family: Cerambycidae
- Genus: Compsibidion
- Species: C. nigroterminatum

Binomial name
- Compsibidion nigroterminatum (Martins, 1965)

Species of beetle

Compsibidion nigroterminatum is a species of beetle in the family Cerambycidae. It was described by Martins in 1965.
