= Compsibidion balium =

Scientific classification
- Kingdom: Animalia
- Phylum: Arthropoda
- Class: Insecta
- Order: Coleoptera
- Suborder: Polyphaga
- Infraorder: Cucujiformia
- Family: Cerambycidae
- Genus: Compsibidion
- Species: C. balium

Binomial name
- Compsibidion balium Napp & Martins, 1985

Species of beetle

Compsibidion balium is a species of beetle in the family Cerambycidae. It was described by Napp and Martins in 1985.
