= Compsibidion zikani =

Scientific classification
- Kingdom: Animalia
- Phylum: Arthropoda
- Class: Insecta
- Order: Coleoptera
- Suborder: Polyphaga
- Infraorder: Cucujiformia
- Family: Cerambycidae
- Genus: Compsibidion
- Species: C. zikani

Binomial name
- Compsibidion zikani (Melzer, 1933)

Species of beetle

Compsibidion zikani is a species of beetle in the family Cerambycidae. It was described by Melzer in 1933.
