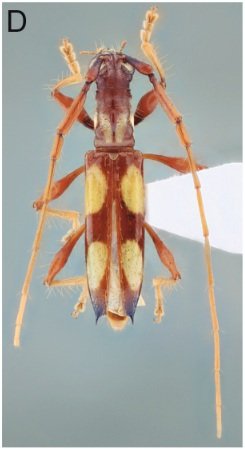

Scientific classification
- Kingdom: Animalia
- Phylum: Arthropoda
- Clade: Pancrustacea
- Class: Insecta
- Order: Coleoptera
- Suborder: Polyphaga
- Infraorder: Cucujiformia
- Family: Cerambycidae
- Genus: Compsibidion
- Species: C. ilium

Binomial name
- Compsibidion ilium (Thomson, 1864)

Synonyms
- Lylibaeum ilium Thomson, 1864

= Compsibidion ilium =

Species of beetle

Compsibidion ilium is a species of beetle in the family Cerambycidae. It was described by Thomson in 1864. It is found in Peru, Venezuela, Bolivia and Brazil (Mato Grosso, Bahia, Minas Gerais, Espirito Santo, Rio de Janeiro, São Paulo).
