= Ubirajara Ribeiro Martins =

Brazilian entomologist (1932–2015)

- Born: Ubirajara Ribeiro Martins de Souza; 8 July 1932; São Paulo, Brazil
- Died: 26 May 2015 (aged 82); São Paulo, Brazil
- Education: Universidade Federal de Viçosa
- Known for: Ubirajara R. Martins, Bira
- Awards: 1964 Guggenheim Fellowship for Organismic Biology & Ecology
- Scientific career
- Fields: Entomology
- Workplaces: Museum of Zoology of the University of São Paulo
- Doctoral advisor: Paulo Vanzolini
- Author abbrev. (zoology): Martins, U.R.

Ubirajara Ribeiro Martins (8 July 1932 – 26 May 2015) was a Brazilian entomologist.

== Biography ==
Martins was born on 8 July 1932, in São Paulo. He concluded his studies at the Universidade Federal de Viçosa in 1954 with a bachelor's degree in agronomy.

Martins then proceeded to work at the Museum of Zoology of the University of São Paulo where he obtained his PhD in 1975 and conducted his research until his death in 2015. He was a colleague of Werner Bokermann, who named one frog species after him (Bokermannohyla martinsi). He himself described many new species of beetles, and often co-authored other descriptions.

He was president of the Brazilian Entomological Society from 1983 to 1986. Bira, as he was kindly called by his colleagues and students, worked at the Museum of Zoology of University of São Paulo since 1959. He became one of the most important coleopterists of his time and an expert in the South American Cerambycidae.
