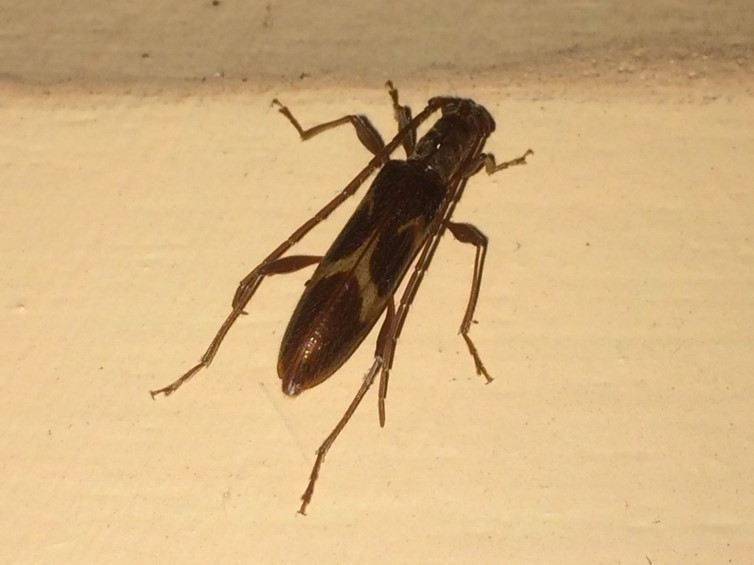
- Pygmodeon validicorne

Scientific classification
- Domain: Eukaryota
- Kingdom: Animalia
- Phylum: Arthropoda
- Class: Insecta
- Order: Coleoptera
- Suborder: Polyphaga
- Infraorder: Cucujiformia
- Family: Cerambycidae
- Genus: Pygmodeon

= Pygmodeon =

Genus of beetles

Pygmodeon is a genus of beetles in the family Cerambycidae, containing the following species:

- Pygmodeon andreae (Germar, 1824)
- Pygmodeon boreale Martins, 1971
- Pygmodeon buscki (Linsley, 1935)
- Pygmodeon cribripenne (Bates, 1880)
- Pygmodeon ditelum (Bates, 1872)
- Pygmodeon excelsum Martins & Napp, 1986
- Pygmodeon involutum (Bates, 1870)
- Pygmodeon latevittatum (Bates, 1885)
- Pygmodeon m-littera (Martins, 1962)
- Pygmodeon mutabile (Melzer, 1935)
- Pygmodeon obtusum (Bates, 1874)
- Pygmodeon puniceum Martins, 1970
- Pygmodeon staurotum Martins, 1970
- Pygmodeon validicorne (Bates, 1885)
