= Pygmodeon excelsum =

Scientific classification
- Domain: Eukaryota
- Kingdom: Animalia
- Phylum: Arthropoda
- Class: Insecta
- Order: Coleoptera
- Suborder: Polyphaga
- Infraorder: Cucujiformia
- Family: Cerambycidae
- Genus: Pygmodeon
- Species: P. excelsum

Binomial name
- Pygmodeon excelsum Martins & Napp, 1986

Species of beetle

Pygmodeon excelsum is a species of beetle in the family Cerambycidae. It was described by Martins and Napp in 1986.
