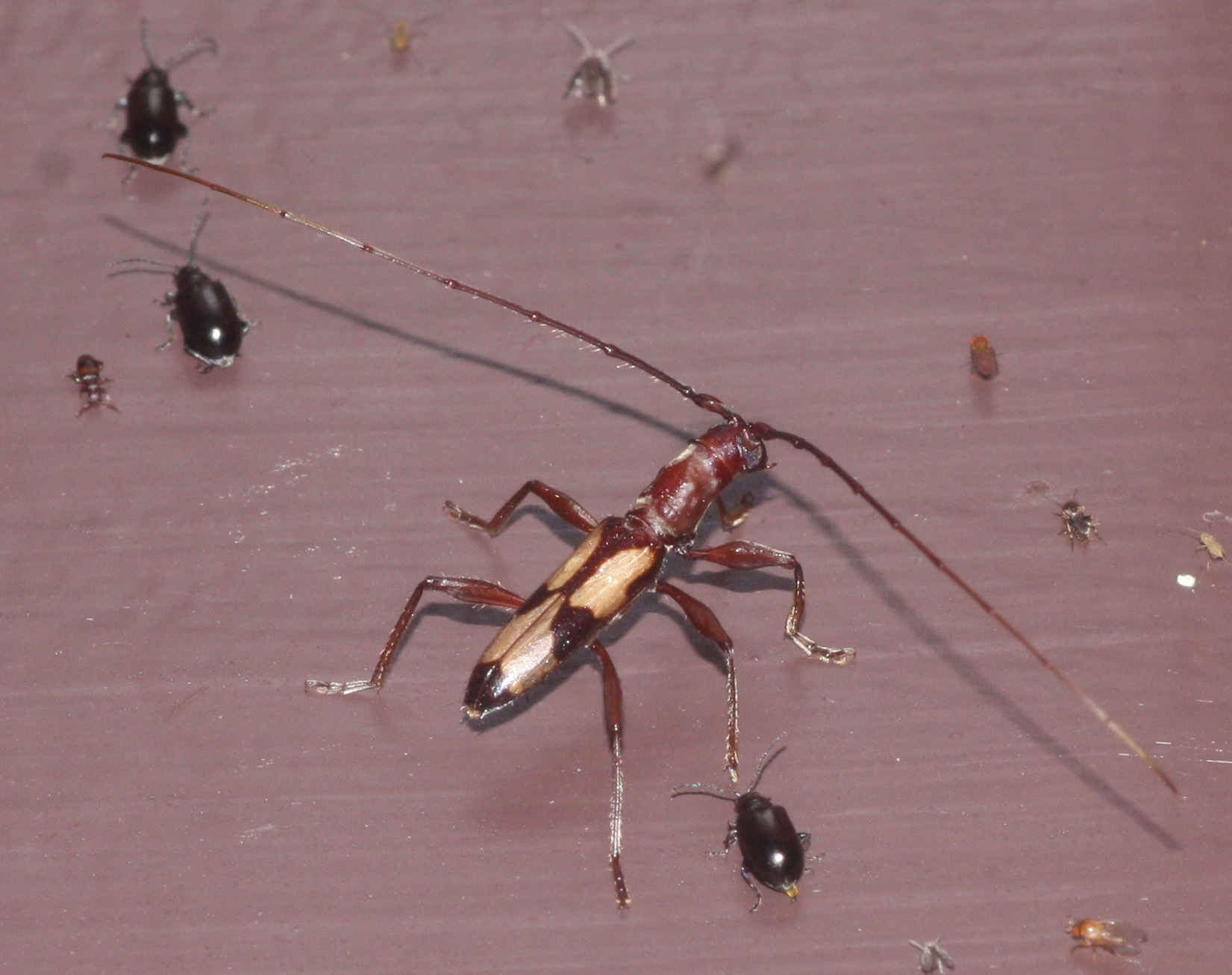

Scientific classification
- Kingdom: Animalia
- Phylum: Arthropoda
- Class: Insecta
- Order: Coleoptera
- Suborder: Polyphaga
- Infraorder: Cucujiformia
- Family: Cerambycidae
- Genus: Pygmodeon
- Species: P. mutabile

Binomial name
- Pygmodeon mutabile (Melzer, 1935)

= Pygmodeon mutabile =

Species of beetle

Pygmodeon mutabile is a species of beetle in the family Cerambycidae. It was described by Melzer in 1935.
