= Pygmodeon andreae =

Scientific classification
- Domain: Eukaryota
- Kingdom: Animalia
- Phylum: Arthropoda
- Class: Insecta
- Order: Coleoptera
- Suborder: Polyphaga
- Infraorder: Cucujiformia
- Family: Cerambycidae
- Genus: Pygmodeon
- Species: P. andreae

Binomial name
- Pygmodeon andreae (Germar, 1824)

Species of beetle

Pygmodeon andreae is a species of beetle in the family Cerambycidae. It was described by Ernst Friedrich Germar in 1824.
