= Pygmodeon m-littera =

Scientific classification
- Domain: Eukaryota
- Kingdom: Animalia
- Phylum: Arthropoda
- Class: Insecta
- Order: Coleoptera
- Suborder: Polyphaga
- Infraorder: Cucujiformia
- Family: Cerambycidae
- Genus: Pygmodeon
- Species: P. m-littera

Binomial name
- Pygmodeon m-littera (Martins, 1962)

Species of beetle

Pygmodeon m-littera is a species of beetle in the family Cerambycidae. It was described by Martins in 1962.
