= Pygmodeon involutum =

Scientific classification
- Kingdom: Animalia
- Phylum: Arthropoda
- Clade: Pancrustacea
- Class: Insecta
- Order: Coleoptera
- Suborder: Polyphaga
- Infraorder: Cucujiformia
- Family: Cerambycidae
- Genus: Pygmodeon
- Species: P. involutum

Binomial name
- Pygmodeon involutum (Bates, 1870)

Species of beetle

Pygmodeon involutum is a species of beetle in the family Cerambycidae. It was described by Bates in 1870.
