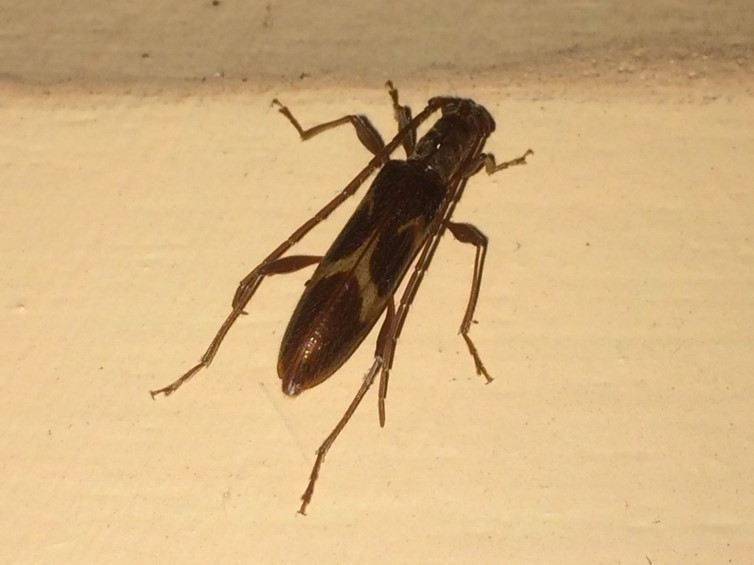

Scientific classification
- Domain: Eukaryota
- Kingdom: Animalia
- Phylum: Arthropoda
- Class: Insecta
- Order: Coleoptera
- Suborder: Polyphaga
- Infraorder: Cucujiformia
- Family: Cerambycidae
- Genus: Pygmodeon
- Species: P. validicorne

Binomial name
- Pygmodeon validicorne (Bates, 1885)

= Pygmodeon validicorne =

Species of beetle

Pygmodeon validicorne is a species of beetle in the family Cerambycidae. It was described by Bates in 1885.

== Distribution and habitat ==
Pygmodeon validicorne is known to be found in Costa Rica.
