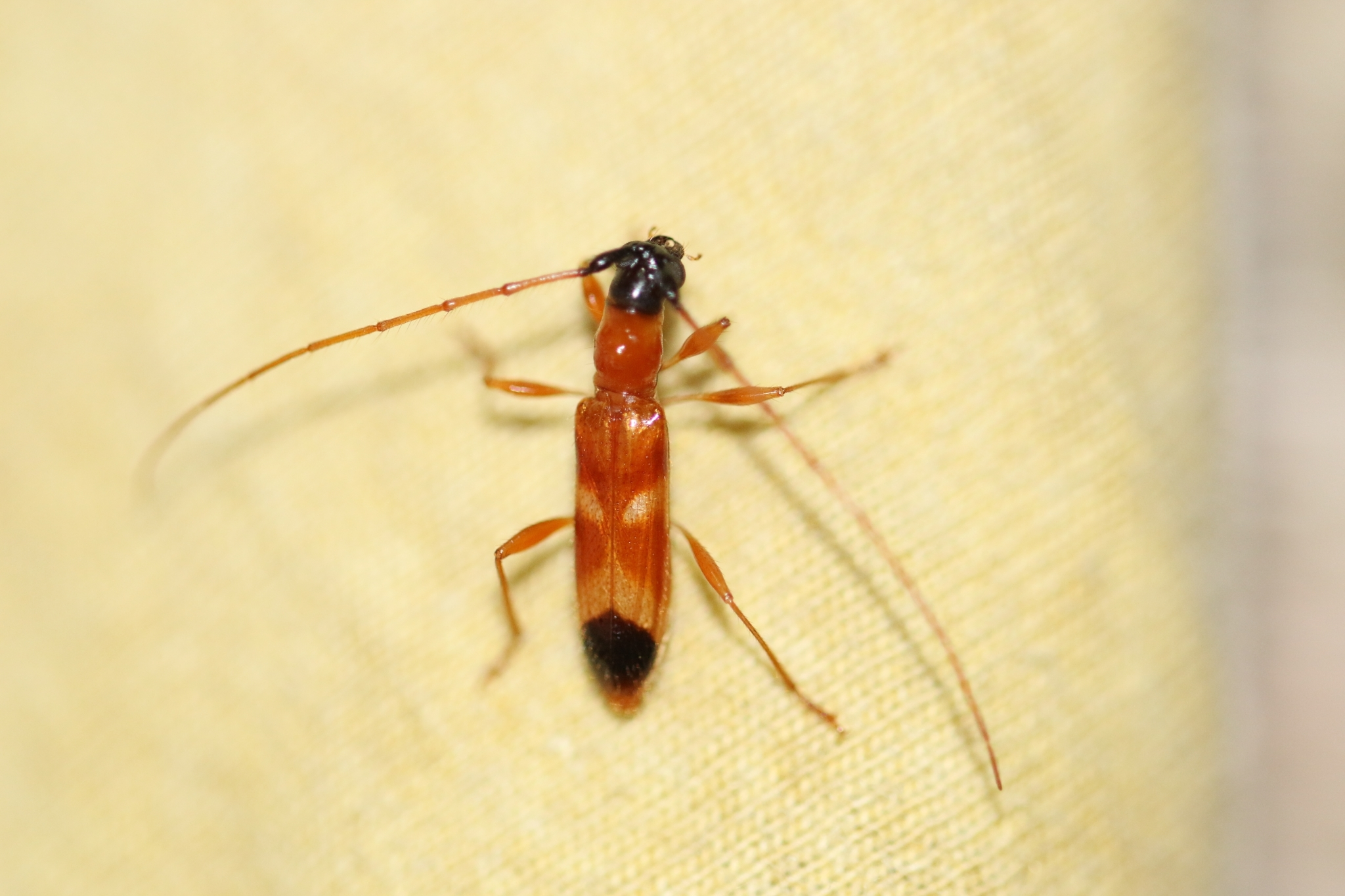

Scientific classification
- Domain: Eukaryota
- Kingdom: Animalia
- Phylum: Arthropoda
- Class: Insecta
- Order: Coleoptera
- Suborder: Polyphaga
- Infraorder: Cucujiformia
- Family: Cerambycidae
- Genus: Pygmodeon
- Species: P. ditelum

Binomial name
- Pygmodeon ditelum (Bates, 1872)

= Pygmodeon ditelum =

Species of beetle

Pygmodeon ditelum is a species of beetle in the family Cerambycidae. It was described by Henry Walter Bates in 1872.
