= Pygmodeon puniceum =

Scientific classification
- Domain: Eukaryota
- Kingdom: Animalia
- Phylum: Arthropoda
- Class: Insecta
- Order: Coleoptera
- Suborder: Polyphaga
- Infraorder: Cucujiformia
- Family: Cerambycidae
- Genus: Pygmodeon
- Species: P. puniceum

Binomial name
- Pygmodeon puniceum Martins, 1970

Species of beetle

Pygmodeon puniceum is a species of beetle in the family Cerambycidae. It was described by Martins in 1970.
