= Stenophantes herrerai =

Scientific classification
- Kingdom: Animalia
- Phylum: Arthropoda
- Class: Insecta
- Order: Coleoptera
- Suborder: Polyphaga
- Infraorder: Cucujiformia
- Family: Cerambycidae
- Genus: Stenophantes
- Species: S. herrerai

Binomial name
- Stenophantes herrerai Cerda, 1987

Species of beetle

Stenophantes herrerai is a species of beetle in the family Cerambycidae. It was described by Cerda in 1987.
