= Proholopterini =

Scientific classification
- Kingdom: Animalia
- Phylum: Arthropoda
- Class: Insecta
- Order: Coleoptera
- Suborder: Polyphaga
- Infraorder: Cucujiformia
- Family: Cerambycidae
- Subfamily: Cerambycinae
- Tribe: Proholopterini; Monné, 2012

Tribe of beetles

Proholopterini is a tribe of beetles in the subfamily Cerambycinae, containing the following genera and species:

- Genus Neholopterus
  - Neholopterus antarcticus Aurivillius, 1910
  - Neholopterus ochraceus Bruch, 1918
  - Neholopterus reedi Bruch, 1918
  - Neholopterus richteri Bruch, 1918
- Genus Proholopterus
  - Proholopterus annulicornis (Philippi & Philippi, 1859)
  - Proholopterus chilensis (Blanchard in Gay, 1851)
  - Proholopterus laevigatus (Philippi & Philippi, 1859)
- Genus Stenophantes
  - Stenophantes herrerai Cerda, 1987
  - Stenophantes longipes Burmeister, 1861
  - Stenophantes martinezi Cerda, 1980
  - Stenophantes patagonicus Bruch, 1918
