= Stenophantes patagonicus =

Scientific classification
- Kingdom: Animalia
- Phylum: Arthropoda
- Class: Insecta
- Order: Coleoptera
- Suborder: Polyphaga
- Infraorder: Cucujiformia
- Family: Cerambycidae
- Genus: Stenophantes
- Species: S. patagonicus

Binomial name
- Stenophantes patagonicus Bruch, 1918

Species of beetle

Stenophantes patagonicus is a species of beetle in the family Cerambycidae. It was described by Bruch in 1918.
