= Proholopterus chilensis =

Scientific classification
- Kingdom: Animalia
- Phylum: Arthropoda
- Class: Insecta
- Order: Coleoptera
- Suborder: Polyphaga
- Infraorder: Cucujiformia
- Family: Cerambycidae
- Genus: Proholopterus
- Species: P. chilensis

Binomial name
- Proholopterus chilensis (Blanchard in Gay, 1851)

Species of beetle

Proholopterus chilensis is a species of beetle in the family Cerambycidae. It was described by Blanchard in 1851.
