= Proholopterus annulicornis =

Scientific classification
- Kingdom: Animalia
- Phylum: Arthropoda
- Clade: Pancrustacea
- Class: Insecta
- Order: Coleoptera
- Suborder: Polyphaga
- Infraorder: Cucujiformia
- Family: Cerambycidae
- Genus: Proholopterus
- Species: P. annulicornis

Binomial name
- Proholopterus annulicornis (Philippi & Philippi, 1859)

Synonyms
- Holopterus araneipes Fairmaire & Germain, 1859

Species of beetle

Proholopterus annulicornis is a species of beetle in the family Cerambycidae. It was described by the father and son pair Rodolfo Amando Philippi and Federico Philippi in 1859.
