= Neholopterus antarcticus =

Scientific classification
- Missing taxonomy template (fix): Neholopterus
- Species: Template:Taxonomy/NeholopterusN. antarcticus

Binomial name
- Template:Taxonomy/NeholopterusNeholopterus antarcticus Aurivillius, 1910

Species of beetle

Neholopterus antarcticus is a species of beetle in the family Cerambycidae. It was described by Per Olof Christopher Aurivillius in 1910.
