= Neholopterus reedi =

Scientific classification
- Kingdom: Animalia
- Phylum: Arthropoda
- Class: Insecta
- Order: Coleoptera
- Suborder: Polyphaga
- Infraorder: Cucujiformia
- Family: Cerambycidae
- Genus: Neholopterus
- Species: N. reedi

Binomial name
- Neholopterus reedi Bruch, 1918

Species of beetle

Neholopterus reedi is a species of beetle in the family Cerambycidae. It was described by Bruch in 1918.
