= Stenophantes longipes =

Scientific classification
- Kingdom: Animalia
- Phylum: Arthropoda
- Class: Insecta
- Order: Coleoptera
- Suborder: Polyphaga
- Infraorder: Cucujiformia
- Family: Cerambycidae
- Genus: Stenophantes
- Species: S. longipes

Binomial name
- Stenophantes longipes Burmeister, 1861

Species of beetle

Stenophantes longipes is a species of beetle in the family Cerambycidae. It was described by Hermann Burmeister in 1861.
