= Neholopterus ochraceus =

Scientific classification
- Kingdom: Animalia
- Phylum: Arthropoda
- Class: Insecta
- Order: Coleoptera
- Suborder: Polyphaga
- Infraorder: Cucujiformia
- Family: Cerambycidae
- Genus: Neholopterus
- Species: N. ochraceus

Binomial name
- Neholopterus ochraceus Bruch, 1918

Species of beetle

Neholopterus ochraceus is a species of beetle in the family Cerambycidae. It was described by Bruch in 1918.
