= Proholopterus laevigatus =

Scientific classification
- Kingdom: Animalia
- Phylum: Arthropoda
- Class: Insecta
- Order: Coleoptera
- Suborder: Polyphaga
- Infraorder: Cucujiformia
- Family: Cerambycidae
- Genus: Proholopterus
- Species: P. laevigatus

Binomial name
- Proholopterus laevigatus (Philippi & Philippi, 1859)

Species of beetle

Proholopterus laevigatus is a species of beetle in the family Cerambycidae. It was described by Philippi and Philippi in 1859.
