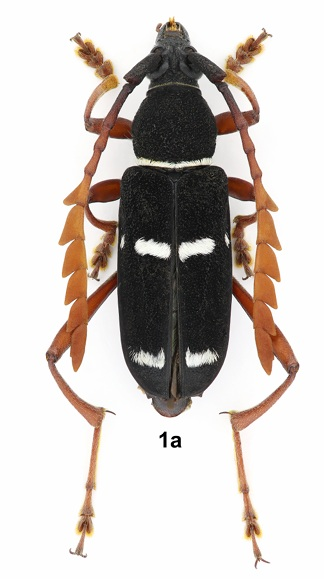

Scientific classification
- Domain: Eukaryota
- Kingdom: Animalia
- Phylum: Arthropoda
- Class: Insecta
- Order: Coleoptera
- Suborder: Polyphaga
- Infraorder: Cucujiformia
- Family: Cerambycidae
- Genus: Euryarthrum
- Species: E. petramarketae

Binomial name
- Euryarthrum petramarketae Viktora, 2025

= Euryarthrum petramarketae =

Species of beetle

Euryarthrum petramarketae is a species of beetle of the Scarabaeidae family. This species is found in Vietnam.

Adults reach a length of about 14.1 mm. The colour of their body ranges from reddish brown to black.

== Etymology ==
The species is dedicated to the daughter (Petra) and wife (Markéta) of the author.
