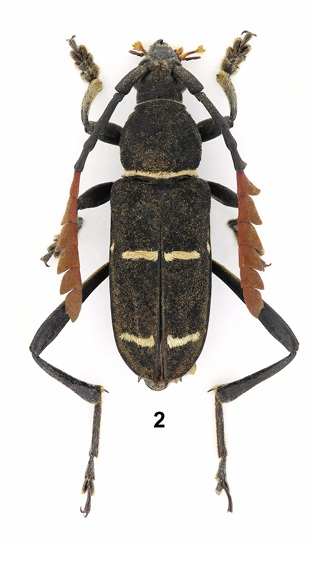

Scientific classification
- Domain: Eukaryota
- Kingdom: Animalia
- Phylum: Arthropoda
- Class: Insecta
- Order: Coleoptera
- Suborder: Polyphaga
- Infraorder: Cucujiformia
- Family: Cerambycidae
- Genus: Euryarthrum
- Species: E. apicefasciatum

Binomial name
- Euryarthrum apicefasciatum Hüdepohl, 1988

= Euryarthrum apicefasciatum =

Species of beetle

Euryarthrum apicefasciatum is a species of beetle of the Scarabaeidae family. This species was described from the Cameron Highlands in peninsular Malaysia.
