= Euryarthrum =

Scientific classification
- Kingdom: Animalia
- Phylum: Arthropoda
- Class: Insecta
- Order: Coleoptera
- Suborder: Polyphaga
- Infraorder: Cucujiformia
- Family: Cerambycidae
- Subfamily: Cerambycinae
- Tribe: Prothemini
- Genus: Euryarthrum; Blanchard, 1845

Synonyms
- Blemmya Pascoe 1857

Genus of beetles

Euryarthrum is a genus of longhorn beetles in the family Cerambycidae.

== Species ==
- Euryarthrum albocinctum Blanchard, 1845
- Euryarthrum apicefasciatum Hüdepohl, 1988
- Euryarthrum assimile Yoshitake & Niisato, 2010
- Euryarthrum atripenne Pascoe, 1866
- Euryarthrum aurantiacum Holzschuh, 2008
- Euryarthrum bifasciatum (Pascoe, 1857)
- Euryarthrum carinatum Pascoe, 1866
- Euryarthrum dilatipenne Holzschuh, 2008
- Euryarthrum egenum Pascoe, 1866
- Euryarthrum elegans Hayashi, 1977
- Euryarthrum gibbulum Holzschuh, 2008
- Euryarthrum hastigerum Holzschuh, 2008
- Euryarthrum inopinans Holzschuh, 2010
- Euryarthrum interruptum Pascoe, 1866
- Euryarthrum kalimantanense Yoshitake & Niisato, 2009
- Euryarthrum nodicolle Pascoe, 1866
- Euryarthrum petramarketae Viktora, 2025
- Euryarthrum pubiventre Holzschuh, 2008
- Euryarthrum rubati Fuchs, 1966
- Euryarthrum rubricolle Holzschuh, 1991
- Euryarthrum takakuwai Yoshitake & Niisato, 2009
