= Prothemini =

Scientific classification
- Domain: Eukaryota
- Kingdom: Animalia
- Phylum: Arthropoda
- Class: Insecta
- Order: Coleoptera
- Suborder: Polyphaga
- Infraorder: Cucujiformia
- Family: Cerambycidae
- Subfamily: Cerambycinae
- Tribe: Prothemini; Lacordaire, 1868

Tribe of beetles

Prothemini is a tribe of beetles in the subfamily Cerambycinae, containing the following genera:

- Euryarthrum Blanchard, 1845
- Homalomelas White, 1855
- Prothema Pascoe, 1857
