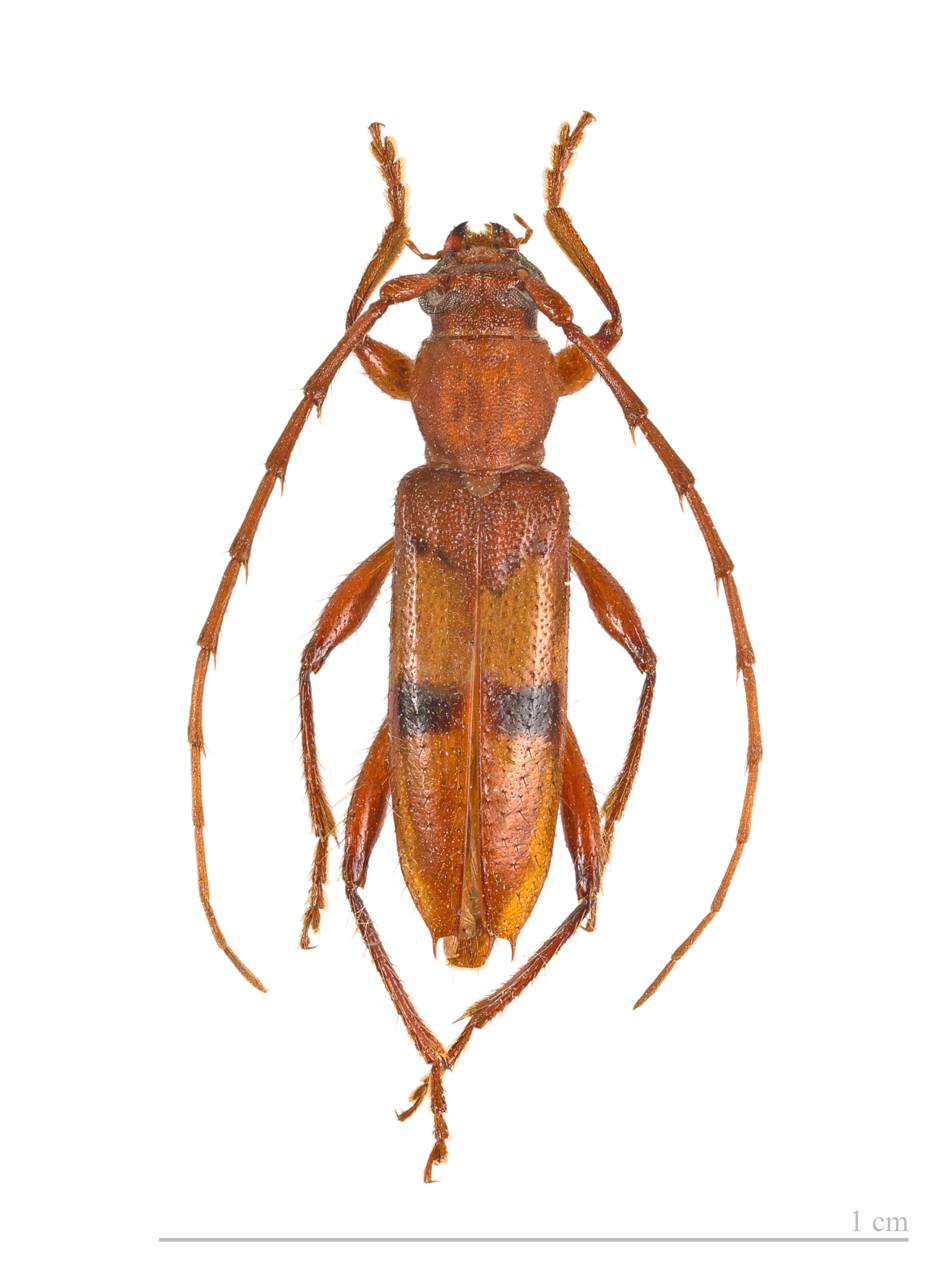
- Clausirion comptum

Scientific classification
- Domain: Eukaryota
- Kingdom: Animalia
- Phylum: Arthropoda
- Class: Insecta
- Order: Coleoptera
- Suborder: Polyphaga
- Infraorder: Cucujiformia
- Family: Cerambycidae
- Subfamily: Cerambycinae
- Tribe: Elaphidiini; Ivie, 1985

= Elaphidiini =

Tribe of beetles

Elaphidiini is a tribe of beetles in the subfamily Cerambycinae, historically also often spelled "Elaphidionini".

== Genera ==
- Adiposphaerion Martins & Napp, 1992
- Aetheibidion Martins, 1968
- Alicianella Noguera, 2006
- Allotisis Pascoe, 1866
- Allotraeus Bates, 1887
- Ambonus Gistel, 1848
- Amethysphaerion Martins & Monné, 1975
- Amorupi Martins, 2005
- Anama Martins, 2005
- Aneflomorpha Casey, 1912
- Aneflus LeConte, 1873
- Anelaphus Linsley, 1936
- Anopliomorpha Linsley, 1936
- Anoplocurius Fisher, 1920
- Apoclausirion Martins & Napp, 1992
- Aposphaerion Bates, 1870
- Appula Thomson, 1864
- Apyrauna Martins, 2005
- Armylaena Thomson, 1878
- Astromula Chemsak & Linsley, 1965
- Atesta Pascoe, 1866
- Atharsus Bates, 1867
- Atylostagma White, 1853
- Centrocerum Chevrolat, 1861
- Clausirion Martins & Napp, 1984
- Coleocoptus Aurivillius, 1893
- Conosphaeron Linsley, 1935
- Coptocercus Hope, 1840
- Cordylomera Audinet-Serville, 1834
- Cotyperiboeum Glileo & Martins, 2010
- Curtomerus
- Demelius Waterhouse, 1874
- Elaphidion Audinet-Serville, 1834
- Elaphidionopsis Linsley, 1936
- Enaphalodes Haldemann, 1847
- Epithora Pascoe, 1866
- Etymosphaerion Martins & Monné, 1975
- Eurysthea Thomson, 1860
- Eustromula Cockerell, 1906
- Gymnopsyra Linsley, 1937
- Hemilissopsis Lane, 1959
- Heteronyssicus Tavakilian & Dalens, 2014
- Hoplogrammicosum Gounelle, 1913
- Ironeus Bates, 1872
- Iuaca Galileo & Martins, 2000
- Jampruca Napp & Martins, 1982
- Lanephus Martins, 2005
- Linsleyonides Skiles, 1985
- Liogramma Bates, 1874
- Magaliella Galileo & Martins, 2008
- Mallocera Audinet-Serville, 1833
- Meganeflus Linsley, 1961
- Megapsyrassa Linsley, 1961
- Mephritus Pascoe, 1866
- Metironeus Chemsak, 1991
- Micraneflus Linsley, 1957
- Micranoplium Linsley, 1947
- Micropsyrassa Linsley, 1961
- Miltesthus Bates, 1872
- Minipsyrassa Martins, 1974
- Monoplia Newman, 1845
- Morphaneflus Martins & Napp, 1992
- Neaneflus Linsley, 1957
- Neomallocera Martins & Napp, 1992
- Neoperiboeum Linsley, 1961
- Nephalioides Linsley, 1961
- Nephalius Newman, 1841
- Nesanoplium Chemsak, 1966
- Nesiosphaerion Martins & Napp, 1982
- Nesodes Linsley, 1935
- Nyphasia Pascoe, 1867
- Nyssicostylus Melzer, 1923
- Nyssicus Pascoe, 1859
- Orion Guérin-Méneville, 1844
- Orwellion Skiles, 1985
- Pantonyssus Bates, 1870
- Paranyssicus Martins, 2005
- Parapantonyssus Galileo & Martins, 2010
- Paraskeletodes Aurivillius, 1927
- Parasphaerion Martins & Napp, 1992
- Parastizocera Linsley, 1961
- Paratesta Wang, Q., 1993
- Parelaphidion Skiles, 1985
- Periboeum Thomson, 1864
- Phoracantha Newman, 1840
- Phytrocaria Wang, Q., 1996
- Piezophidion Galileo & Martins, 1992
- Pilisphaerion Martins & Napp, 1992
- Poecilomallus Bates, 1892
- Porithodes Aurivillius, 1912
- Protomallocera Martins & Napp, 1992
- Protosphaerion Gounelle, 1909
- Pseudomallocera Zajciw, 1961
- Pseudoperiboeum Linsley, 1935
- Psyrassa Pascoe, 1866
- Psyrassaforma Chemsak, 1991
- Rhomboidederes Zajciw, 1963
- Romulus Knull, 1948
- Semiphoracantha Vives, Sudre, Mille & Cazères, 2011
- Skeletodes Newman, 1850
- Sphaerioeme Martins & Napp, 1992
- Sphaerion Audinet-Serville, 1834
- Sphaerionillum Bates, 1885
- Steata Wang, Q., 1995
- Stenelaphus Linsley, 1936
- Stenosphenus Haldemann, 1847
- Stizocera Audinet-Serville, 1834
- Terpnissa Bates, 1867
- Thoris Pascoe, 1867
- Trichophoroides Linsley, 1935
- Tropimerus Giesbert, 1987
- Urorcites Thomson, 1878
- Yorkeica Blackburn, 1899
