= Mephritus apicatus =

Scientific classification
- Kingdom: Animalia
- Phylum: Arthropoda
- Class: Insecta
- Order: Coleoptera
- Suborder: Polyphaga
- Infraorder: Cucujiformia
- Family: Cerambycidae
- Genus: Mephritus
- Species: M. apicatus

Binomial name
- Mephritus apicatus (Linsley, 1935)

Synonyms
- Nephalius apicatus Linsley, 1935; Mephritus apicatus Napp & Martins, 1991

Species of beetle

Mephritus apicatus is a species of longhorn beetle in the Elaphidiini subfamily. It is endemic to La Chorrera, Panama where it was described by Linsley in 1935
