= Anama =

Anama may refer to:

== Places ==
- Anama, New Zealand, a sparsely populated locality in the Canterbury region of the South Island
- Anama, South Australia, a locality and historic pastoral run in the Mid North region
- Anamã, a municipality in the Brazilian state of Amazonas
- Anamoq also known as Anama, a village in East Azerbaijan Province, Iran
- Krabozavodskoye, a village formerly known as Anama on the island of Shikotan in the Kuril Islands

== Other uses ==
- Anama (beetle), a genus of beetles in the family Cerambycidae
- ANAMA, the Azerbaijan National Agency for Mine Action
- AnamA, a Brazilian metal band
