= Trichophoroides dozieri =

Scientific classification
- Kingdom: Animalia
- Phylum: Arthropoda
- Class: Insecta
- Order: Coleoptera
- Suborder: Polyphaga
- Infraorder: Cucujiformia
- Family: Cerambycidae
- Genus: Trichophoroides
- Species: T. dozieri

Binomial name
- Trichophoroides dozieri (Fisher, 1932)

Species of beetle

Trichophoroides dozieri is a species of beetle in the family Cerambycidae. It was described by Fisher in 1932.
