= Mephritus guttatus =

Scientific classification
- Kingdom: Animalia
- Phylum: Arthropoda
- Class: Insecta
- Order: Coleoptera
- Suborder: Polyphaga
- Infraorder: Cucujiformia
- Family: Cerambycidae
- Genus: Mephritus
- Species: M. guttatus

Binomial name
- Mephritus guttatus Napp & Martins, 1982

Species of beetle

Mephritus guttatus is a species of beetle in the family Cerambycidae. It was described by Napp and Martins in 1982.
