= Nesanoplium dalensi =

Scientific classification
- Kingdom: Animalia
- Phylum: Arthropoda
- Class: Insecta
- Order: Coleoptera
- Suborder: Polyphaga
- Infraorder: Cucujiformia
- Family: Cerambycidae
- Genus: Nesanoplium
- Species: N. dalensi

Binomial name
- Nesanoplium dalensi Chalumeau & Touroult, 2005

Species of beetle

Nesanoplium dalensi is a species of beetle in the family Cerambycidae. It was described by Chalumeau and Touroult in 2005.
