= Anopliomorpha antillarum =

Scientific classification
- Domain: Eukaryota
- Kingdom: Animalia
- Phylum: Arthropoda
- Class: Insecta
- Order: Coleoptera
- Suborder: Polyphaga
- Infraorder: Cucujiformia
- Family: Cerambycidae
- Genus: Anopliomorpha
- Species: A. antillarum

Binomial name
- Anopliomorpha antillarum (Fisher, 1932)

Species of beetle

Anopliomorpha antillarum is a species of beetle in the family Cerambycidae. It was described by Fisher in 1932.
