= Neaneflus fuchsii =

Scientific classification
- Kingdom: Animalia
- Phylum: Arthropoda
- Class: Insecta
- Order: Coleoptera
- Suborder: Polyphaga
- Infraorder: Cucujiformia
- Family: Cerambycidae
- Genus: Neaneflus
- Species: N. fuchsii

Binomial name
- Neaneflus fuchsii (Wickham, 1905)

Species of beetle

Neaneflus fuchsii is a species of beetle in the family Cerambycidae. It was described by Wickham in 1905.
