= Anoplocurius altus =

Scientific classification
- Kingdom: Animalia
- Phylum: Arthropoda
- Clade: Pancrustacea
- Class: Insecta
- Order: Coleoptera
- Suborder: Polyphaga
- Infraorder: Cucujiformia
- Family: Cerambycidae
- Genus: Anoplocurius
- Species: A. = altus

Binomial name
- Anoplocurius = altus Knull, 1942

Species of beetle

Anoplocurius altus is a species of long horned beetle in the family Cerambycidae. It was first described by Knull in 1942.
