= Orwellion occidentalis =

Scientific classification
- Kingdom: Animalia
- Phylum: Arthropoda
- Class: Insecta
- Order: Coleoptera
- Suborder: Polyphaga
- Infraorder: Cucujiformia
- Family: Cerambycidae
- Genus: Orwellion
- Species: O. occidentalis

Binomial name
- Orwellion occidentalis (Giesbert & Hovore, 1976)

Species of beetle

Orwellion occidentalis is a species of beetle in the family Cerambycidae. It was described by Giesbert and Hovore in 1976.
