= Sphaerionillum castaneum =

Scientific classification
- Kingdom: Animalia
- Phylum: Arthropoda
- Class: Insecta
- Order: Coleoptera
- Suborder: Polyphaga
- Infraorder: Cucujiformia
- Family: Cerambycidae
- Genus: Sphaerionillum
- Species: S. castaneum

Binomial name
- Sphaerionillum castaneum Chemsak & Linsley, 1967

Species of beetle

Sphaerionillum castaneum is a species of beetle in the family Cerambycidae. It was described by Chemsak and Linsley in 1967.
