= Anoplocurius canotiae =

Scientific classification
- Domain: Eukaryota
- Kingdom: Animalia
- Phylum: Arthropoda
- Class: Insecta
- Order: Coleoptera
- Suborder: Polyphaga
- Infraorder: Cucujiformia
- Family: Cerambycidae
- Genus: Anoplocurius
- Species: A. canotiae

Binomial name
- Anoplocurius canotiae Fisher, 1920

Species of beetle

Anoplocurius canotiae is a species of beetle in the family Cerambycidae. It was described by Fisher in 1920.
