= Mallocera spinicollis =

Scientific classification
- Kingdom: Animalia
- Phylum: Arthropoda
- Class: Insecta
- Order: Coleoptera
- Suborder: Polyphaga
- Infraorder: Cucujiformia
- Family: Cerambycidae
- Genus: Mallocera
- Species: M. spinicollis

Binomial name
- Mallocera spinicollis Bates, 1872

Species of beetle

Mallocera spinicollis is a species of beetle in the family Cerambycidae. It was described by Henry Walter Bates in 1872.
