= Trichophoroides albisparsus =

Scientific classification
- Kingdom: Animalia
- Phylum: Arthropoda
- Class: Insecta
- Order: Coleoptera
- Suborder: Polyphaga
- Infraorder: Cucujiformia
- Family: Cerambycidae
- Genus: Trichophoroides
- Species: T. albisparsus

Binomial name
- Trichophoroides albisparsus (Bates, 1872)

Species of beetle

Trichophoroides albisparsus is a species of beetle in the family Cerambycidae. It was described by Bates in 1872.
