= Micropsyrassa =

Scientific classification
- Domain: Eukaryota
- Kingdom: Animalia
- Phylum: Arthropoda
- Class: Insecta
- Order: Coleoptera
- Suborder: Polyphaga
- Infraorder: Cucujiformia
- Family: Cerambycidae
- Tribe: Elaphidiini
- Genus: Micropsyrassa

Genus of beetles

Micropsyrassa is a genus of beetles in the family Cerambycidae, containing the following species:

- Micropsyrassa bimaculata (Bates, 1872)
- Micropsyrassa doyeni Chemsak & Giesbert, 1986
- Micropsyrassa glabrata Martins & Chemsak, 1966
- Micropsyrassa meridionalis Martins, 1974
- Micropsyrassa minima Martins & Chemsak, 1966
- Micropsyrassa nitida Martins & Chemsak, 1966
- Micropsyrassa opaca Martins & Chemsak, 1966
- Micropsyrassa pilosella (Bates, 1892)
- Micropsyrassa reticulata Martins & Chemsak, 1966
- Micropsyrassa stellata Martins & Chemsak, 1966
