= Mephritus quadrimaculatus =

Scientific classification
- Kingdom: Animalia
- Phylum: Arthropoda
- Class: Insecta
- Order: Coleoptera
- Suborder: Polyphaga
- Infraorder: Cucujiformia
- Family: Cerambycidae
- Genus: Mephritus
- Species: M. quadrimaculatus

Binomial name
- Mephritus quadrimaculatus Martins & Napp, 1992

Species of beetle

Mephritus quadrimaculatus is a species of beetle in the family Cerambycidae. It was described by Martins and Napp in 1992.
