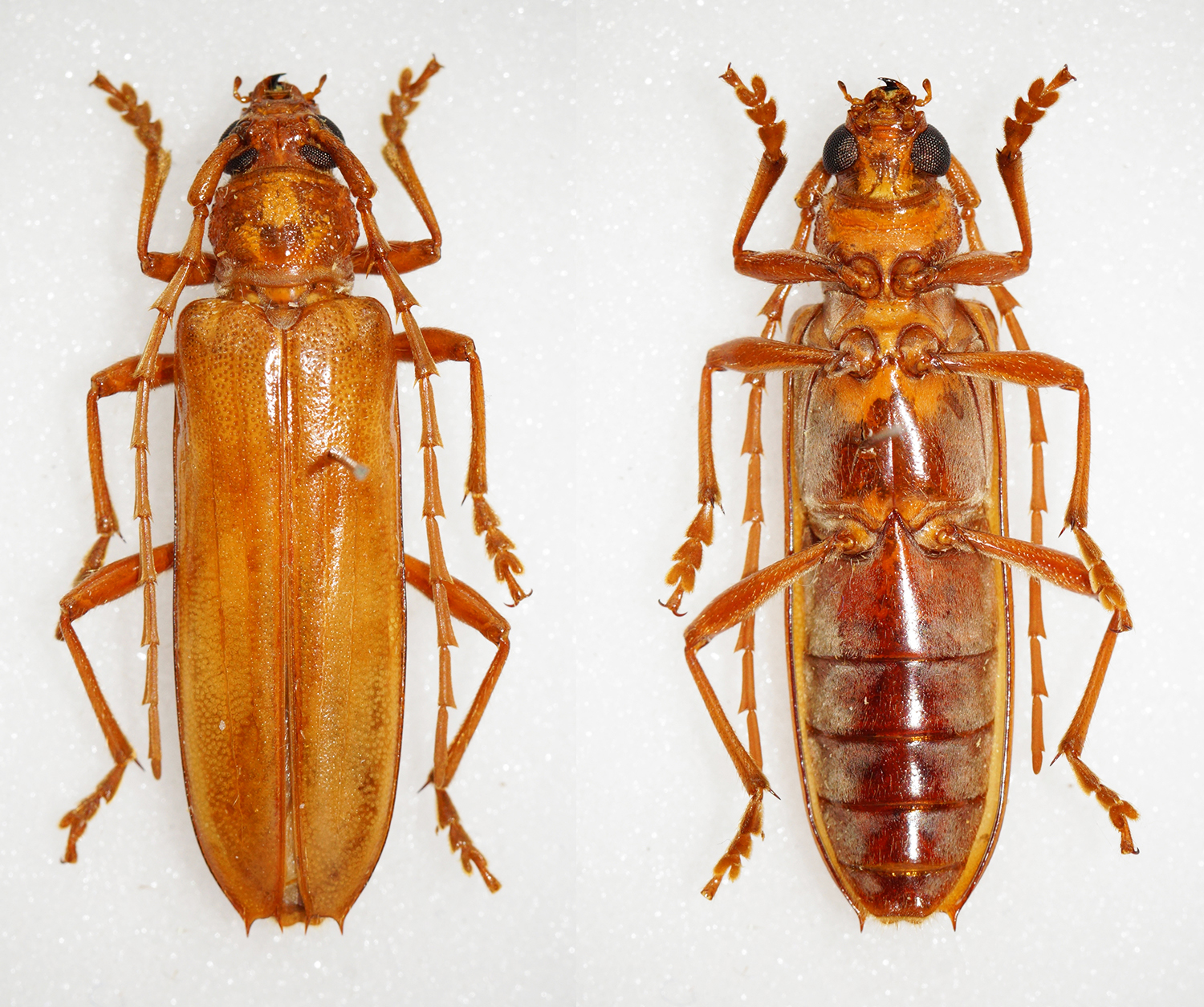
- Atylostagma politum

Scientific classification
- Kingdom: Animalia
- Phylum: Arthropoda
- Class: Insecta
- Order: Coleoptera
- Suborder: Polyphaga
- Infraorder: Cucujiformia
- Family: Cerambycidae
- Tribe: Elaphidiini
- Genus: Atylostagma; White, 1853
- Species: A. politum

Binomial name
- Atylostagma politum White, 1853

Synonyms
- Atylostagma glabrum Schaeffer, 1909; Atylostagma glabra Auctt. (Missp.); Atylostagma polita Auctt. (Missp.)

= Atylostagma =

Genus of beetles

Atylostagma is a genus of beetles in the family Cerambycidae, containing a single species, Atylostagma politum.
