= Paranyssicus tresorensis =

Scientific classification
- Kingdom: Animalia
- Phylum: Arthropoda
- Class: Insecta
- Order: Coleoptera
- Suborder: Polyphaga
- Infraorder: Cucujiformia
- Family: Cerambycidae
- Genus: Paranyssicus
- Species: P. tresorensis

Binomial name
- Paranyssicus tresorensis Dalens, 2011

Species of beetle

Paranyssicus tresorensis is a species of beetle in the family Cerambycidae. It was described by Dalens in 2011.
