= Aposphaerion =

Scientific classification
- Domain: Eukaryota
- Kingdom: Animalia
- Phylum: Arthropoda
- Class: Insecta
- Order: Coleoptera
- Suborder: Polyphaga
- Infraorder: Cucujiformia
- Family: Cerambycidae
- Subfamily: Cerambycinae
- Tribe: Elaphidiini
- Genus: Aposphaerion; Bates, 1870

Genus of beetles

Aposphaerion is a genus of beetles in the family Cerambycidae, containing the following species:

- Aposphaerion fasciatum (Martins, 1971)
- Aposphaerion longicolle Bates, 1870
- Aposphaerion nigritum Galileo & Martins, 2010
- Aposphaerion punctulatum Martins & Napp, 1992
- Aposphaerion unicolor (White, 1855)
