= Orwellion lineatum =

Scientific classification
- Kingdom: Animalia
- Phylum: Arthropoda
- Class: Insecta
- Order: Coleoptera
- Suborder: Polyphaga
- Infraorder: Cucujiformia
- Family: Cerambycidae
- Genus: Orwellion
- Species: O. lineatum

Binomial name
- Orwellion lineatum Skiles, 1985

Species of beetle

Orwellion lineatum is a species of beetle in the family Cerambycidae. It was described by Skiles in 1985.
