= Protosphaerion =

Scientific classification
- Kingdom: Animalia
- Phylum: Arthropoda
- Class: Insecta
- Order: Coleoptera
- Suborder: Polyphaga
- Infraorder: Cucujiformia
- Family: Cerambycidae
- Subfamily: Cerambycinae
- Tribe: Elaphidiini
- Genus: Protosphaerion; Gounelle, 1909

Genus of beetles

Protosphaerion is a genus of beetles in the family Cerambycidae, containing the following species:

- Protosphaerion loreum Gounelle, 1909
- Protosphaerion pictum Martins, 2005
- Protosphaerion punctatum Martins, 2005
- Protosphaerion signatipenne Gounelle, 1909
- Protosphaerion variabile Gounelle, 1909
