= Nesiosphaerion =

Scientific classification
- Kingdom: Animalia
- Phylum: Arthropoda
- Class: Insecta
- Order: Coleoptera
- Suborder: Polyphaga
- Infraorder: Cucujiformia
- Family: Cerambycidae
- Subfamily: Cerambycinae
- Tribe: Elaphidiini
- Genus: Nesiosphaerion; Martins & Napp, 1982Martins & Napp, 1982

Genus of beetles

Nesiosphaerion is a genus of beetles in the family Cerambycidae, containing the following species:

- Nesiosphaerion caymanensis (Fisher, 1948)
- Nesiosphaerion charynae Lingafelter, 2008
- Nesiosphaerion insulare (White, 1853)
- Nesiosphaerion testaceum (Fisher, 1932)
