= Tropimerus hovorei =

Scientific classification
- Kingdom: Animalia
- Phylum: Arthropoda
- Class: Insecta
- Order: Coleoptera
- Suborder: Polyphaga
- Infraorder: Cucujiformia
- Family: Cerambycidae
- Genus: Tropimerus
- Species: T. hovorei

Binomial name
- Tropimerus hovorei Giesbert, 1987

Species of beetle

Tropimerus hovorei is a species of beetle in the family Cerambycidae. It was described by Giesbert in 1987.
