= Jampruca (beetle) =

Scientific classification
- Domain: Eukaryota
- Kingdom: Animalia
- Phylum: Arthropoda
- Class: Insecta
- Order: Coleoptera
- Suborder: Polyphaga
- Infraorder: Cucujiformia
- Family: Cerambycidae
- Tribe: Elaphidiini
- Genus: Jampruca; Napp & Martins, 1982

Genus of beetles

Jampruca is a genus of beetles in the family Cerambycidae, containing the following species:

- Jampruca nigricornis Napp & Martins, 1982
- Jampruca tyligma Napp & Martins, 1982
