= Ironeus mutatus =

Scientific classification
- Domain: Eukaryota
- Kingdom: Animalia
- Phylum: Arthropoda
- Class: Insecta
- Order: Coleoptera
- Suborder: Polyphaga
- Infraorder: Cucujiformia
- Family: Cerambycidae
- Genus: Ironeus
- Species: I. mutatus

Binomial name
- Ironeus mutatus Bates, 1885

Species of beetle

Ironeus mutatus is a species of beetle in the family Cerambycidae. It was described by Bates in 1885.
