= Neoperiboeum =

Scientific classification
- Kingdom: Animalia
- Phylum: Arthropoda
- Clade: Pancrustacea
- Class: Insecta
- Order: Coleoptera
- Suborder: Polyphaga
- Infraorder: Cucujiformia
- Family: Cerambycidae
- Tribe: Elaphidiini
- Genus: Neoperiboeum

Genus of beetle

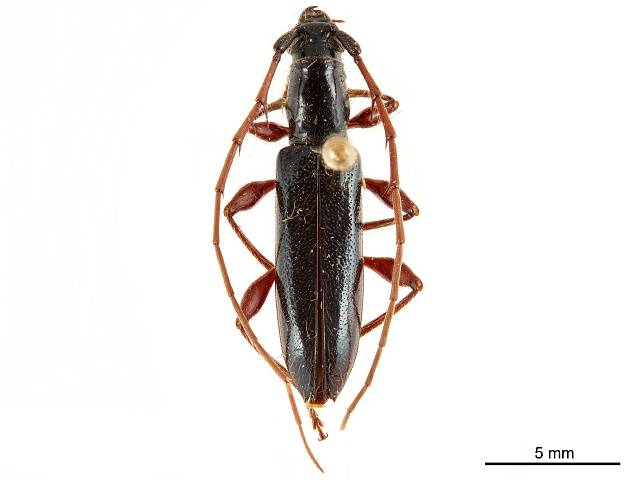
A Neoperiboeum juanitae in the National Museum of National History entomology collection

Neoperiboeum is a genus of beetles in the family Cerambycidae, containing the following species:

- Neoperiboeum juanitae Chemsak, 1991
- Neoperiboeum villosulum (Bates, 1872)
