= Nephalius cassus =

Scientific classification
- Kingdom: Animalia
- Phylum: Arthropoda
- Class: Insecta
- Order: Coleoptera
- Suborder: Polyphaga
- Infraorder: Cucujiformia
- Family: Cerambycidae
- Genus: Nephalius
- Species: N. cassus

Binomial name
- Nephalius cassus Newman, 1841

Species of beetle

Nephalius cassus is a species of beetle in the family Cerambycidae. It was described by Newman in 1841.
