= Aetheibidion =

Scientific classification
- Kingdom: Animalia
- Phylum: Arthropoda
- Class: Insecta
- Order: Coleoptera
- Suborder: Polyphaga
- Infraorder: Cucujiformia
- Family: Cerambycidae
- Tribe: Elaphidiini
- Genus: Aetheibidion; Martins, 1968
- Species: A. hirtellum

Binomial name
- Aetheibidion hirtellum (Gounelle, 1913)

Synonyms
- Ibidion hirtellum Gounelle, 1913

Genus of beetles

Aetheibidion hirtellum is a species of longhorn beetle in the Elaphidiini subfamily, and is the only species in the genus Aetheibidion.
