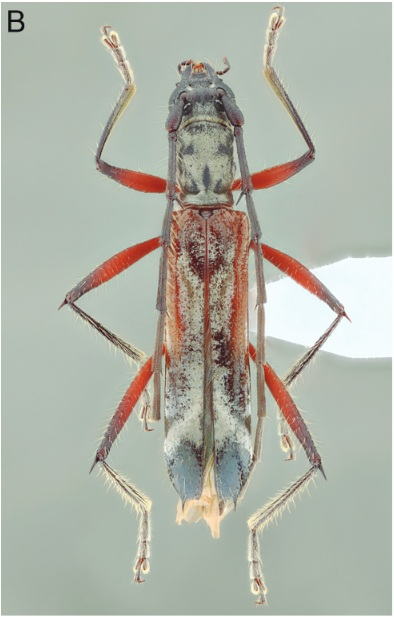

Scientific classification
- Kingdom: Animalia
- Phylum: Arthropoda
- Clade: Pancrustacea
- Class: Insecta
- Order: Coleoptera
- Suborder: Polyphaga
- Infraorder: Cucujiformia
- Family: Cerambycidae
- Genus: Appula
- Species: A. sericatula

Binomial name
- Appula sericatula Gounelle, 1909

= Appula sericatula =

Species of beetle

Appula sericatula is a species of beetle in the family Cerambycidae. It was described by Gounelle in 1909. It is found in Brazil and Paraguay.
