= Sphaerionillum pictum =

Scientific classification
- Kingdom: Animalia
- Phylum: Arthropoda
- Class: Insecta
- Order: Coleoptera
- Suborder: Polyphaga
- Infraorder: Cucujiformia
- Family: Cerambycidae
- Genus: Sphaerionillum
- Species: S. pictum

Binomial name
- Sphaerionillum pictum Bates, 1885

Species of beetle

Sphaerionillum pictum is a species of beetle in the family Cerambycidae. It was described by Henry Walter Bates in 1885.
