= Pantonyssus flavipes =

Scientific classification
- Kingdom: Animalia
- Phylum: Arthropoda
- Class: Insecta
- Order: Coleoptera
- Suborder: Polyphaga
- Infraorder: Cucujiformia
- Family: Cerambycidae
- Genus: Pantonyssus
- Species: P. flavipes

Binomial name
- Pantonyssus flavipes Fisher, 1944

Species of beetle

Pantonyssus flavipes is a species of beetle in the family Cerambycidae. It was described by Fisher in 1944.
