= Trichophoroides niveus =

Scientific classification
- Kingdom: Animalia
- Phylum: Arthropoda
- Clade: Pancrustacea
- Class: Insecta
- Order: Coleoptera
- Suborder: Polyphaga
- Infraorder: Cucujiformia
- Family: Cerambycidae
- Genus: Trichophoroides
- Species: T. niveus

Binomial name
- Trichophoroides niveus Linsley, 1935

Species of beetle

Trichophoroides niveus is a species of beetle in the family Cerambycidae. It was described by Linsley in 1935.
