= Mephritus adelphus =

Scientific classification
- Kingdom: Animalia
- Phylum: Arthropoda
- Class: Insecta
- Order: Coleoptera
- Suborder: Polyphaga
- Infraorder: Cucujiformia
- Family: Cerambycidae
- Genus: Mephritus
- Species: M. adelphus

Binomial name
- Mephritus adelphus (Martins, 1973)

Species of beetle

Mephritus adelphus is a species of beetle in the family Cerambycidae. It was described by Martins in 1973.
