= Mallocera =

Scientific classification
- Kingdom: Animalia
- Phylum: Arthropoda
- Class: Insecta
- Order: Coleoptera
- Suborder: Polyphaga
- Infraorder: Cucujiformia
- Family: Cerambycidae
- Subfamily: Cerambycinae
- Tribe: Elaphidiini
- Genus: Mallocera; Audinet-Serville, 1833

Genus of beetles

Mallocera is a genus of beetles in the family Cerambycidae, containing the following species:

- Mallocera amazonica Bates, 1870
- Mallocera glauca Audinet-Serville, 1833
- Mallocera ramosa Gounelle, 1909
- Mallocera simplex White, 1853
- Mallocera spinicollis Bates, 1872
- Mallocera umbrosa Gounelle, 1909
