= Ironeus =

Scientific classification
- Domain: Eukaryota
- Kingdom: Animalia
- Phylum: Arthropoda
- Class: Insecta
- Order: Coleoptera
- Suborder: Polyphaga
- Infraorder: Cucujiformia
- Family: Cerambycidae
- Tribe: Elaphidiini
- Genus: Ironeus

Genus of beetles

Ironeus is a genus of beetles in the family Cerambycidae, containing the following species:

- Ironeus duplex Bates, 1872
- Ironeus mutatus Bates, 1885
- Ironeus pulcher Bates, 1880
