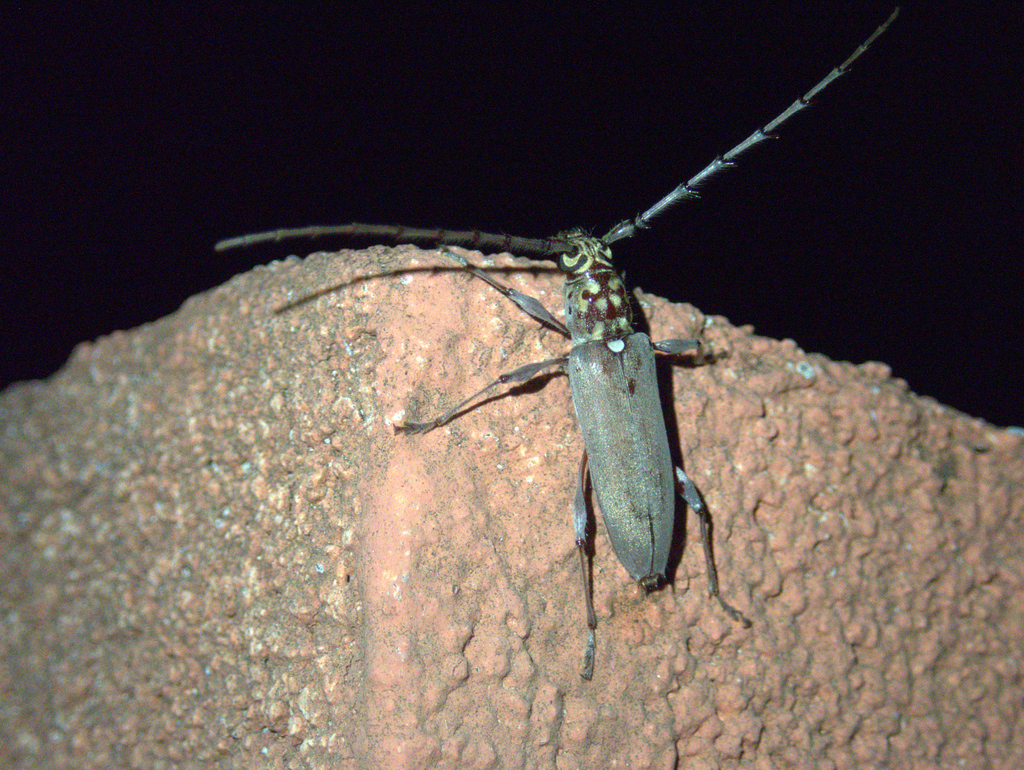
- Trichophoroides signaticolle in Cuba

Scientific classification
- Kingdom: Animalia
- Phylum: Arthropoda
- Class: Insecta
- Order: Coleoptera
- Suborder: Polyphaga
- Infraorder: Cucujiformia
- Family: Cerambycidae
- Genus: Trichophoroides
- Species: T. signaticolle

Binomial name
- Trichophoroides signaticolle (Chevrolat, 1862)

= Trichophoroides signaticolle =

Species of beetle

Trichophoroides signaticolle is a species of beetle in the family Cerambycidae. It was described by Chevrolat in 1862.
