= Protosphaerion variabile =

Scientific classification
- Kingdom: Animalia
- Phylum: Arthropoda
- Class: Insecta
- Order: Coleoptera
- Suborder: Polyphaga
- Infraorder: Cucujiformia
- Family: Cerambycidae
- Genus: Protosphaerion
- Species: P. variabile

Binomial name
- Protosphaerion variabile Gounelle, 1909

Species of beetle

Protosphaerion variabile is a species of beetle in the family Cerambycidae. It was described by Gounelle in 1909.
