= Orwellion =

Scientific classification
- Kingdom: Animalia
- Phylum: Arthropoda
- Class: Insecta
- Order: Coleoptera
- Suborder: Polyphaga
- Infraorder: Cucujiformia
- Family: Cerambycidae
- Subfamily: Cerambycinae
- Tribe: Elaphidiini
- Genus: Orwellion; Skiles, 1985

Genus of beetles

Orwellion is a genus of beetles in the family Cerambycidae containing the following species:

- Orwellion fasciatum Skiles, 1985
- Orwellion gibbulum (Bates, 1880)
- Orwellion lineatum Skiles, 1985
- Orwellion occidentalis (Giesbert & Hovore, 1976)
