= Micropsyrassa meridionalis =

Scientific classification
- Domain: Eukaryota
- Kingdom: Animalia
- Phylum: Arthropoda
- Class: Insecta
- Order: Coleoptera
- Suborder: Polyphaga
- Infraorder: Cucujiformia
- Family: Cerambycidae
- Genus: Micropsyrassa
- Species: M. meridionalis

Binomial name
- Micropsyrassa meridionalis Martins, 1974

Species of beetle

Micropsyrassa meridionalis is a species of beetle in the family Cerambycidae. It was described by Martins in 1974.
