= Nephalius =

Scientific classification
- Kingdom: Animalia
- Phylum: Arthropoda
- Class: Insecta
- Order: Coleoptera
- Suborder: Polyphaga
- Infraorder: Cucujiformia
- Family: Cerambycidae
- Tribe: Elaphidiini
- Genus: Nephalius

Genus of beetles

Nephalius is a genus of beetles in the family Cerambycidae, containing the following species:

- Nephalius cassus Newman, 1841
- Nephalius spiniger (Blanchard in Orbigny, 1847)
