= Periboeum guttigerum =

Scientific classification
- Kingdom: Animalia
- Phylum: Arthropoda
- Class: Insecta
- Order: Coleoptera
- Suborder: Polyphaga
- Infraorder: Cucujiformia
- Family: Cerambycidae
- Genus: Periboeum
- Species: P. guttigerum

Binomial name
- Periboeum guttigerum Napp & Martins, 1984

Species of beetle

Periboeum guttigerum is a species of beetle in the family Cerambycidae. It was described by Napp and Martins in 1984.
