= Nyssicostylus melzeri =

Scientific classification
- Kingdom: Animalia
- Phylum: Arthropoda
- Class: Insecta
- Order: Coleoptera
- Suborder: Polyphaga
- Infraorder: Cucujiformia
- Family: Cerambycidae
- Genus: Nyssicostylus
- Species: N. melzeri

Binomial name
- Nyssicostylus melzeri Chemsak & Martins, 1966

Species of beetle

Nyssicostylus melzeri is a species of beetle in the family Cerambycidae. It was described by Chemsak and Martins in 1966.
