= Appula lateralis =

Scientific classification
- Domain: Eukaryota
- Kingdom: Animalia
- Phylum: Arthropoda
- Class: Insecta
- Order: Coleoptera
- Suborder: Polyphaga
- Infraorder: Cucujiformia
- Family: Cerambycidae
- Genus: Appula
- Species: A. lateralis

Binomial name
- Appula lateralis (White, 1853)

Species of beetle

Appula lateralis is a species of beetle in the family Cerambycidae. It was described by White in 1853.
