= Aposphaerion longicolle =

Scientific classification
- Domain: Eukaryota
- Kingdom: Animalia
- Phylum: Arthropoda
- Class: Insecta
- Order: Coleoptera
- Suborder: Polyphaga
- Infraorder: Cucujiformia
- Family: Cerambycidae
- Genus: Aposphaerion
- Species: A. longicolle

Binomial name
- Aposphaerion longicolle Bates, 1870

Species of beetle

Aposphaerion longicolle is a species of beetle in the family Cerambycidae. It was described by Bates in 1870. It occurs in French Guiana and the Brazilian states of Amazonas, Maranhão, Mato Grosso, and Pará.
