= Metironeus hesperus =

Scientific classification
- Kingdom: Animalia
- Phylum: Arthropoda
- Class: Insecta
- Order: Coleoptera
- Suborder: Polyphaga
- Infraorder: Cucujiformia
- Family: Cerambycidae
- Genus: Metironeus
- Species: M. hesperus

Binomial name
- Metironeus hesperus Chemsak, 1991

Species of beetle

Metironeus hesperus is a species of beetle in the family Cerambycidae and genus Mentironeus. It was described by Chemsak in 1991.
