= Hemilissopsis =

Scientific classification
- Kingdom: Animalia
- Phylum: Arthropoda
- Class: Insecta
- Order: Coleoptera
- Suborder: Polyphaga
- Infraorder: Cucujiformia
- Family: Cerambycidae
- Tribe: Elaphidiini
- Genus: Hemilissopsis

Genus of beetles

Hemilissopsis is a genus of beetles in the family Cerambycidae, containing the following species:

- Hemilissopsis clenchi Lane, 1959
- Hemilissopsis fernandezae Hovore & Chemsak, 2006
