= Tropimerus =

Scientific classification
- Kingdom: Animalia
- Phylum: Arthropoda
- Class: Insecta
- Order: Coleoptera
- Suborder: Polyphaga
- Infraorder: Cucujiformia
- Family: Cerambycidae
- Tribe: Elaphidiini
- Genus: Tropimerus

Genus of beetles

Tropimerus is a genus of beetles in the family Cerambycidae, containing the following species:

- Tropimerus cyaneus Giesbert, 1987
- Tropimerus hovorei Giesbert, 1987
