= Rhomboidederes =

Scientific classification
- Kingdom: Animalia
- Phylum: Arthropoda
- Class: Insecta
- Order: Coleoptera
- Suborder: Polyphaga
- Infraorder: Cucujiformia
- Family: Cerambycidae
- Subfamily: Cerambycinae
- Tribe: Elaphidiini
- Genus: Rhomboidederes; Zajciw, 1963

Genus of beetles

Rhomboidederes is a genus of beetles in the family Cerambycidae, containing the following species:

- Rhomboidederes iuba Galileo & Martins, 2010
- Rhomboidederes minutus Napp & Martins, 1984
- Rhomboidederes ocellicollis Zajciw, 1963
- Rhomboidederes ravidus (Gounelle, 1909)
- Rhomboidederes unicolor (Zajciw, 1967)
