= Metironeus =

Scientific classification
- Kingdom: Animalia
- Phylum: Arthropoda
- Class: Insecta
- Order: Coleoptera
- Suborder: Polyphaga
- Infraorder: Cucujiformia
- Family: Cerambycidae
- Tribe: Elaphidiini
- Genus: Metironeus

Genus of beetles

Metironeus is a genus of beetles in the family Cerambycidae, containing the following species:

- Metironeus hesperus Chemsak, 1991
- Metironeus hovorei Chemsak, 1991
