= Nephalius spiniger =

Scientific classification
- Kingdom: Animalia
- Phylum: Arthropoda
- Class: Insecta
- Order: Coleoptera
- Suborder: Polyphaga
- Infraorder: Cucujiformia
- Family: Cerambycidae
- Genus: Nephalius
- Species: N. spiniger

Binomial name
- Nephalius spiniger (Blanchard in Orbigny, 1847)

Species of beetle

Nephalius spiniger is a species of beetle in the family Cerambycidae. It was described by Blanchard in 1847.
