= Trichophoroides =

Scientific classification
- Kingdom: Animalia
- Phylum: Arthropoda
- Class: Insecta
- Order: Coleoptera
- Suborder: Polyphaga
- Infraorder: Cucujiformia
- Family: Cerambycidae
- Subfamily: Cerambycinae
- Tribe: Elaphidiini
- Genus: Trichophoroides; Linsley, 1935

Genus of beetles

Trichophoroides is a genus of beetles in the family Cerambycidae, containing the following species:

- Trichophoroides albisparsus (Bates, 1872)
- Trichophoroides aurivillii (Linsley, 1961)
- Trichophoroides decipiens (Bates, 1880)
- Trichophoroides dozieri (Fisher, 1932)
- Trichophoroides jansoni (Bates, 1885)
- Trichophoroides niveus Linsley, 1935
- Trichophoroides pilicornis (Fuchs, 1961)
- Trichophoroides signaticolle (Chevrolat, 1862)
- Trichophoroides variolosum (Fisher, 1947)
