= Trichophoroides aurivillii =

Scientific classification
- Kingdom: Animalia
- Phylum: Arthropoda
- Class: Insecta
- Order: Coleoptera
- Suborder: Polyphaga
- Infraorder: Cucujiformia
- Family: Cerambycidae
- Genus: Trichophoroides
- Species: T. aurivillii

Binomial name
- Trichophoroides aurivillii (Linsley, 1961)

Species of beetle

Trichophoroides aurivillii is a species of beetle in the family Cerambycidae. It was described by Linsley in 1961.
