= Nesiosphaerion charynae =

Scientific classification
- Kingdom: Animalia
- Phylum: Arthropoda
- Class: Insecta
- Order: Coleoptera
- Suborder: Polyphaga
- Infraorder: Cucujiformia
- Family: Cerambycidae
- Genus: Nesiosphaerion
- Species: N. charynae

Binomial name
- Nesiosphaerion charynae Lingafelter, 2008

Species of beetle

Nesiosphaerion charynae is a species of beetle in the family Cerambycidae. It was described by Lingafelter in 2008.
