= Anopliomorpha rinconium =

Scientific classification
- Kingdom: Animalia
- Phylum: Arthropoda
- Class: Insecta
- Order: Coleoptera
- Suborder: Polyphaga
- Infraorder: Cucujiformia
- Family: Cerambycidae
- Genus: Anopliomorpha
- Species: A. rinconium

Binomial name
- Anopliomorpha rinconium (Casey, 1924)

Species of beetle

Anopliomorpha rinconium is a species of beetle in the family Cerambycidae. It was described by Casey in 1924.
