= Hemilissopsis fernandezae =

Scientific classification
- Kingdom: Animalia
- Phylum: Arthropoda
- Class: Insecta
- Order: Coleoptera
- Suborder: Polyphaga
- Infraorder: Cucujiformia
- Family: Cerambycidae
- Genus: Hemilissopsis
- Species: H. fernandezae

Binomial name
- Hemilissopsis fernandezae Hovore & Chemsak, 2006

Species of beetle

Hemilissopsis fernandezae is a species of beetle in the family Cerambycidae. It was described by Hovore and Chemsak in 2006.
