= Pseudoperiboeum =

Scientific classification
- Kingdom: Animalia
- Phylum: Arthropoda
- Class: Insecta
- Order: Coleoptera
- Suborder: Polyphaga
- Infraorder: Cucujiformia
- Family: Cerambycidae
- Tribe: Elaphidiini
- Genus: Pseudoperiboeum

Genus of beetles

Pseudoperiboeum is a genus of beetles in the family Cerambycidae, containing the following species:

- Pseudoperiboeum lengi (Schaeffer, 1909)
- Pseudoperiboeum subarmatum Linsley, 1935
