= Mephritus auricolle =

Scientific classification
- Kingdom: Animalia
- Phylum: Arthropoda
- Class: Insecta
- Order: Coleoptera
- Suborder: Polyphaga
- Infraorder: Cucujiformia
- Family: Cerambycidae
- Genus: Mephritus
- Species: M. auricolle

Binomial name
- Mephritus auricolle Tavakilian & Martins, 1991

Species of beetle

Mephritus auricolle is a species of beetle in the family Cerambycidae. It was described by Tavakilian and Martins in 1991.
