= Nesanoplium =

Scientific classification
- Kingdom: Animalia
- Phylum: Arthropoda
- Class: Insecta
- Order: Coleoptera
- Suborder: Polyphaga
- Infraorder: Cucujiformia
- Family: Cerambycidae
- Tribe: Elaphidiini
- Genus: Nesanoplium

Genus of beetles

Nesanoplium is a genus of beetles in the family Cerambycidae, containing the following species:

- Nesanoplium dalensi Chalumeau & Touroult, 2005
- Nesanoplium puberulum (Fleutiaux & Sallé, 1889)
