= Amethysphaerion nigripes =

Scientific classification
- Kingdom: Animalia
- Phylum: Arthropoda
- Class: Insecta
- Order: Coleoptera
- Suborder: Polyphaga
- Infraorder: Cucujiformia
- Family: Cerambycidae
- Genus: Amethysphaerion
- Species: A. nigripes

Binomial name
- Amethysphaerion nigripes Martins & Monné, 1975

Species of beetle

Amethysphaerion nigripes is a species of beetle in the family Cerambycidae. It was described by Martins and Monné in 1975.
