= Pantonyssus pallidus =

Scientific classification
- Kingdom: Animalia
- Phylum: Arthropoda
- Class: Insecta
- Order: Coleoptera
- Suborder: Polyphaga
- Infraorder: Cucujiformia
- Family: Cerambycidae
- Genus: Pantonyssus
- Species: P. pallidus

Binomial name
- Pantonyssus pallidus Martins, 1995

Species of beetle

Pantonyssus pallidus is a species of beetle in the family Cerambycidae. It was described by Martins in 1995.
