= Rhomboidederes ocellicollis =

Scientific classification
- Kingdom: Animalia
- Phylum: Arthropoda
- Class: Insecta
- Order: Coleoptera
- Suborder: Polyphaga
- Infraorder: Cucujiformia
- Family: Cerambycidae
- Genus: Rhomboidederes
- Species: R. ocellicollis

Binomial name
- Rhomboidederes ocellicollis Zajciw, 1963

Species of beetle

Rhomboidederes ocellicollis is a species of beetle in the family Cerambycidae. It was described by Zajciw in 1963.
