= Sphaerionillum =

Scientific classification
- Kingdom: Animalia
- Phylum: Arthropoda
- Class: Insecta
- Order: Coleoptera
- Suborder: Polyphaga
- Infraorder: Cucujiformia
- Family: Cerambycidae
- Tribe: Elaphidiini
- Genus: Sphaerionillum

Genus of beetles

Sphaerionillum is a genus of beetles in the family Cerambycidae, containing the following species:

- Sphaerionillum castaneum Chemsak & Linsley, 1967
- Sphaerionillum pictum Bates, 1885
- Sphaerionillum quadrisignatum Bates, 1885
