= Mallocera amazonica =

Scientific classification
- Kingdom: Animalia
- Phylum: Arthropoda
- Class: Insecta
- Order: Coleoptera
- Suborder: Polyphaga
- Infraorder: Cucujiformia
- Family: Cerambycidae
- Genus: Mallocera
- Species: M. amazonica

Binomial name
- Mallocera amazonica Bates, 1870

Species of beetle

Mallocera amazonica is a species of beetle in the family Cerambycidae. It was described by Bates in 1870.
