= Periboeum =

Scientific classification
- Kingdom: Animalia
- Phylum: Arthropoda
- Class: Insecta
- Order: Coleoptera
- Suborder: Polyphaga
- Infraorder: Cucujiformia
- Family: Cerambycidae
- Subfamily: Cerambycinae
- Tribe: Elaphidiini
- Genus: Periboeum; Thomson, 1864

Genus of beetles

Periboeum is a genus of beetles in the family Cerambycidae, containing the following species:

- Periboeum acuminatum (Thomson, 1860)
- Periboeum aduncum Napp & Martins, 1984
- Periboeum atylodes Salvador, 1978
- Periboeum bolivianum Martins & Monné, 1975
- Periboeum dilectum Napp & Martins, 1984
- Periboeum guttigerum Napp & Martins, 1984
- Periboeum maculatum Magno, 1987
- Periboeum metallicum Magno, 1987
- Periboeum obscuricorne Martins & Monné, 1975
- Periboeum ocellatum Gounelle, 1909
- Periboeum paraense Napp & Martins, 1984
- Periboeum paucispinum (Lameere, 1890)
- Periboeum piliferum (Erichson, 1847)
- Periboeum pubescens (Olivier, 1790)
- Periboeum spinosum Galileo & Martins, 2010
- Periboeum terminatum (Perroud, 1855)
- Periboeum umbrosum Gounelle, 1909
- Periboeum vicinum (Perroud, 1855)
