= Periboeum paraense =

Scientific classification
- Kingdom: Animalia
- Phylum: Arthropoda
- Class: Insecta
- Order: Coleoptera
- Suborder: Polyphaga
- Infraorder: Cucujiformia
- Family: Cerambycidae
- Genus: Periboeum
- Species: P. paraense

Binomial name
- Periboeum paraense Napp & Martins, 1984

Species of beetle

Periboeum paraense is a species of beetle in the family Cerambycidae. It was described by Napp and Martins in 1984.
