= Periboeum maculatum =

Scientific classification
- Kingdom: Animalia
- Phylum: Arthropoda
- Class: Insecta
- Order: Coleoptera
- Suborder: Polyphaga
- Infraorder: Cucujiformia
- Family: Cerambycidae
- Genus: Periboeum
- Species: P. maculatum

Binomial name
- Periboeum maculatum Magno, 1987

Species of beetle

Periboeum maculatum is a species of beetle in the family Cerambycidae. It was described by Magno in 1987.
