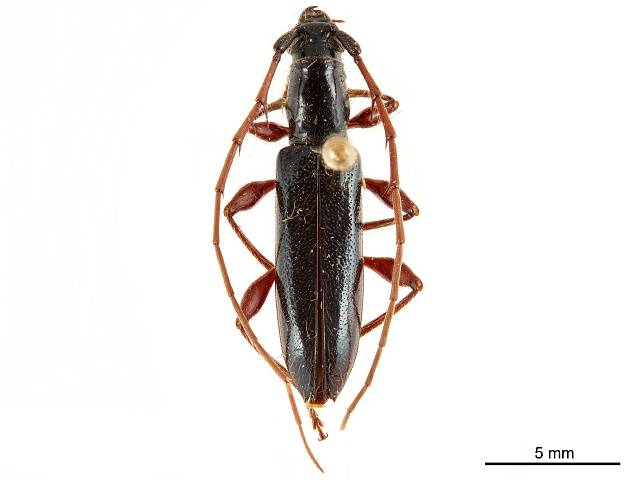

Scientific classification
- Kingdom: Animalia
- Phylum: Arthropoda
- Class: Insecta
- Order: Coleoptera
- Suborder: Polyphaga
- Infraorder: Cucujiformia
- Family: Cerambycidae
- Genus: Neoperiboeum
- Species: N. juanitae

Binomial name
- Neoperiboeum juanitae Chemsak, 1991

= Neoperiboeum juanitae =

Species of beetle

Neoperiboeum juanitae is a species of beetle in the family Cerambycidae. It was described by Chemsak in 1991.
