= Appula =

Scientific classification
- Domain: Eukaryota
- Kingdom: Animalia
- Phylum: Arthropoda
- Class: Insecta
- Order: Coleoptera
- Suborder: Polyphaga
- Infraorder: Cucujiformia
- Family: Cerambycidae
- Subfamily: Cerambycinae
- Tribe: Elaphidiini
- Genus: Appula; Thomson, 1864

Genus of beetles

Appula is a genus of beetles in the family Cerambycidae, containing the following species:

- Appula aliena Martins, 1981
- Appula argenteoapicalis Fuchs, 1961
- Appula diamantinensis Franceschini, 2002
- Appula eduardae Franceschini, 2002
- Appula lateralis (White, 1853)
- Appula melancholica Gounelle, 1909
- Appula nigripes Bates, 1870
- Appula santarensis Franceschini, 2002
- Appula sericatula Gounelle, 1909
- Appula undulans (White, 1853)
