= Mallocera glauca =

Scientific classification
- Kingdom: Animalia
- Phylum: Arthropoda
- Class: Insecta
- Order: Coleoptera
- Suborder: Polyphaga
- Infraorder: Cucujiformia
- Family: Cerambycidae
- Genus: Mallocera
- Species: M. glauca

Binomial name
- Mallocera glauca Audinet-Serville, 1833

Species of beetle

Mallocera glauca is a species of beetle in the family Cerambycidae. It was described by Audinet-Serville in 1833.
