= Pseudoperiboeum lengi =

Scientific classification
- Kingdom: Animalia
- Phylum: Arthropoda
- Class: Insecta
- Order: Coleoptera
- Suborder: Polyphaga
- Infraorder: Cucujiformia
- Family: Cerambycidae
- Genus: Pseudoperiboeum
- Species: P. lengi

Binomial name
- Pseudoperiboeum lengi (Schaeffer, 1909)

Species of beetle

Pseudoperiboeum lengi is a species of beetle in the family Cerambycidae. It was described by Schaeffer in 1909.
