= Pseudoperiboeum subarmatum =

Scientific classification
- Kingdom: Animalia
- Phylum: Arthropoda
- Class: Insecta
- Order: Coleoptera
- Suborder: Polyphaga
- Infraorder: Cucujiformia
- Family: Cerambycidae
- Genus: Pseudoperiboeum
- Species: P. subarmatum

Binomial name
- Pseudoperiboeum subarmatum Linsley, 1935

Species of beetle

Pseudoperiboeum subarmatum is a species of beetle in the family Cerambycidae. It was described by Linsley in 1935.
