= Neaneflus brevispinus =

Scientific classification
- Kingdom: Animalia
- Phylum: Arthropoda
- Class: Insecta
- Order: Coleoptera
- Suborder: Polyphaga
- Infraorder: Cucujiformia
- Family: Cerambycidae
- Genus: Neaneflus
- Species: N. brevispinus

Binomial name
- Neaneflus brevispinus Chemsak, 1962

Species of beetle

Neaneflus brevispinus is a species of beetle in the family Cerambycidae. It was described by Chemsak in 1962.
