= Eustromula =

Scientific classification
- Kingdom: Animalia
- Phylum: Arthropoda
- Class: Insecta
- Order: Coleoptera
- Suborder: Polyphaga
- Infraorder: Cucujiformia
- Family: Cerambycidae
- Subfamily: Cerambycinae
- Tribe: Elaphidiini
- Genus: Eustromula; Cockerell, 1909

Synonyms
- Eustroma LeConte, 1873 (Preocc.)

Genus of beetles

Eustromula is a genus of beetles in the family Cerambycidae, containing the following species: The name was proposed by Cockerell as a replacement for a preoccupied name, "Eustroma."

- Eustromula keiferi Linsley, 1934
- Eustromula valida (LeConte, 1858)
