= Eustromula valida =

Scientific classification
- Domain: Eukaryota
- Kingdom: Animalia
- Phylum: Arthropoda
- Class: Insecta
- Order: Coleoptera
- Suborder: Polyphaga
- Infraorder: Cucujiformia
- Family: Cerambycidae
- Genus: Eustromula
- Species: E. valida

Binomial name
- Eustromula valida (LeConte, 1858)

Species of beetle

Eustromula valida is a species of beetle in the family Cerambycidae. It was described by John Lawrence LeConte in 1858, and placed in the new genus Eustromula by Cockerell in 1909
