= Nesiosphaerion testaceum =

Scientific classification
- Kingdom: Animalia
- Phylum: Arthropoda
- Class: Insecta
- Order: Coleoptera
- Suborder: Polyphaga
- Infraorder: Cucujiformia
- Family: Cerambycidae
- Genus: Nesiosphaerion
- Species: N. testaceum

Binomial name
- Nesiosphaerion testaceum (Fisher, 1932)

Species of beetle

Nesiosphaerion testaceum is a species of beetle in the family Cerambycidae. It was described by Fisher in 1932.
