= Anoplocurius =

Scientific classification
- Domain: Eukaryota
- Kingdom: Animalia
- Phylum: Arthropoda
- Class: Insecta
- Order: Coleoptera
- Suborder: Polyphaga
- Infraorder: Cucujiformia
- Family: Cerambycidae
- Subfamily: Cerambycinae
- Tribe: Elaphidiini
- Genus: Anoplocurius; Fisher, 1920

Genus of beetles

Anoplocurius is a genus of beetles in the family Cerambycidae, containing the following species:

- Anoplocurius altus Knull, 1942
- Anoplocurius canotiae Fisher, 1920
- Anoplocurius incompletus Linsley, 1942
