= Conosphaeron concolor =

Scientific classification
- Kingdom: Animalia
- Phylum: Arthropoda
- Clade: Pancrustacea
- Class: Insecta
- Order: Coleoptera
- Suborder: Polyphaga
- Infraorder: Cucujiformia
- Family: Cerambycidae
- Genus: Conosphaeron
- Species: C. concolor

Binomial name
- Conosphaeron concolor Linsley, 1935

Species of beetle

Conosphaeron concolor is a species of beetle in the family Cerambycidae. It was described by Linsley in 1935.
