= Pantonyssus erichsonii =

Scientific classification
- Kingdom: Animalia
- Phylum: Arthropoda
- Class: Insecta
- Order: Coleoptera
- Suborder: Polyphaga
- Infraorder: Cucujiformia
- Family: Cerambycidae
- Genus: Pantonyssus
- Species: P. erichsonii

Binomial name
- Pantonyssus erichsonii (White, 1853)

Species of beetle

Pantonyssus erichsonii is a species of beetle in the family Cerambycidae. It was described by White in 1853.
