= Periboeum obscuricorne =

Scientific classification
- Kingdom: Animalia
- Phylum: Arthropoda
- Class: Insecta
- Order: Coleoptera
- Suborder: Polyphaga
- Infraorder: Cucujiformia
- Family: Cerambycidae
- Genus: Periboeum
- Species: P. obscuricorne

Binomial name
- Periboeum obscuricorne Martins & Monné, 1975

Species of beetle

Periboeum obscuricorne is a species of beetle in the family Cerambycidae. It was described by Martins and Monné in 1975.
