= Amethysphaerion =

Scientific classification
- Kingdom: Animalia
- Phylum: Arthropoda
- Class: Insecta
- Order: Coleoptera
- Suborder: Polyphaga
- Infraorder: Cucujiformia
- Family: Cerambycidae
- Subfamily: Cerambycinae
- Tribe: Elaphidiini
- Genus: Amethysphaerion; Martins & Monné, 1975

Genus of beetles

Amethysphaerion is a genus of beetles in the family Cerambycidae, containing the following species:

- Amethysphaerion eximium Martins & Napp, 1992
- Amethysphaerion falsus Martins, 1995
- Amethysphaerion guarani Martins & Napp, 1992
- Amethysphaerion jocosum Martins & Napp, 1992
- Amethysphaerion nigripes Martins & Monné, 1975
- Amethysphaerion submetallicum Martins & Napp, 1992
- Amethysphaerion trinidadensis (Gilmour, 1963)
- Amethysphaerion tuna Martins, 2005
