= Pantonyssus glabricollis =

Scientific classification
- Kingdom: Animalia
- Phylum: Arthropoda
- Class: Insecta
- Order: Coleoptera
- Suborder: Polyphaga
- Infraorder: Cucujiformia
- Family: Cerambycidae
- Genus: Pantonyssus
- Species: P. glabricollis

Binomial name
- Pantonyssus glabricollis E. Fuchs, 1961

Species of beetle

Pantonyssus glabricollis is a species of beetle in the family Cerambycidae. It was described by Ernst Fuchs in 1961.
