= Eustromula keiferi =

Scientific classification
- Domain: Eukaryota
- Kingdom: Animalia
- Phylum: Arthropoda
- Class: Insecta
- Order: Coleoptera
- Suborder: Polyphaga
- Infraorder: Cucujiformia
- Family: Cerambycidae
- Genus: Eustromula
- Species: E. keiferi

Binomial name
- Eustromula keiferi Linsley, 1934

Species of beetle

Eustromula keiferi is a species of beetle in the family Cerambycidae. It was described by Earle Gorton Linsley in 1934.
