= Anopliomorpha =

Scientific classification
- Kingdom: Animalia
- Phylum: Arthropoda
- Clade: Pancrustacea
- Class: Insecta
- Order: Coleoptera
- Suborder: Polyphaga
- Infraorder: Cucujiformia
- Family: Cerambycidae
- Subfamily: Cerambycinae
- Tribe: Elaphidiini
- Genus: Anopliomorpha; Linsley, 1936

Genus of beetles

Anopliomorpha is a genus of beetles in the family Cerambycidae, containing the following species:

- Anopliomorpha antennata Chemsak & Noguera, 1993
- Anopliomorpha antillarum (Fisher, 1932)
- Anopliomorpha gracilis Chemsak & Noguera, 1993
- Anopliomorpha hirsutum (Linsley, 1935)
- Anopliomorpha reticolle (Bates, 1885)
- Anopliomorpha rinconium (Casey, 1924)
