= Amethysphaerion trinidadensis =

Scientific classification
- Kingdom: Animalia
- Phylum: Arthropoda
- Class: Insecta
- Order: Coleoptera
- Suborder: Polyphaga
- Infraorder: Cucujiformia
- Family: Cerambycidae
- Genus: Amethysphaerion
- Species: A. trinidadensis

Binomial name
- Amethysphaerion trinidadensis (Gilmour, 1963)

Species of beetle

Amethysphaerion trinidadensis is a species of beetle in the family Cerambycidae. It was described by Gilmour in 1963.
