= Mephritus genuinus =

Scientific classification
- Kingdom: Animalia
- Phylum: Arthropoda
- Class: Insecta
- Order: Coleoptera
- Suborder: Polyphaga
- Infraorder: Cucujiformia
- Family: Cerambycidae
- Genus: Mephritus
- Species: M. genuinus

Binomial name
- Mephritus genuinus Napp & Martins, 1982

Species of beetle

Mephritus genuinus is a species of beetle in the family Cerambycidae. It was described by Napp and Martins in 1982.
