= Rhomboidederes unicolor =

Scientific classification
- Kingdom: Animalia
- Phylum: Arthropoda
- Class: Insecta
- Order: Coleoptera
- Suborder: Polyphaga
- Infraorder: Cucujiformia
- Family: Cerambycidae
- Genus: Rhomboidederes
- Species: R. unicolor

Binomial name
- Rhomboidederes unicolor (Zajciw, 1967)

Species of beetle

Rhomboidederes unicolor is a species of beetle in the family Cerambycidae. It was described by Zajciw in 1967.
