= Trichophoroides pilicornis =

Scientific classification
- Kingdom: Animalia
- Phylum: Arthropoda
- Class: Insecta
- Order: Coleoptera
- Suborder: Polyphaga
- Infraorder: Cucujiformia
- Family: Cerambycidae
- Genus: Trichophoroides
- Species: T. pilicornis

Binomial name
- Trichophoroides pilicornis (E. Fuchs, 1961)

Species of beetle

Trichophoroides pilicornis is a species of beetle in the family Cerambycidae. It was described by Ernst Fuchs in 1961.
