= Conosphaeron =

Scientific classification
- Kingdom: Animalia
- Phylum: Arthropoda
- Class: Insecta
- Order: Coleoptera
- Suborder: Polyphaga
- Infraorder: Cucujiformia
- Family: Cerambycidae
- Tribe: Elaphidiini
- Genus: Conosphaeron

Genus of beetles

Conosphaeron is a genus of beetles in the family Cerambycidae, containing the following species:

- Conosphaeron concolor Linsley, 1935
- Conosphaeron spinipenne Chemsak & Linsley, 1967
