= Periboeum acuminatum =

Scientific classification
- Kingdom: Animalia
- Phylum: Arthropoda
- Class: Insecta
- Order: Coleoptera
- Suborder: Polyphaga
- Infraorder: Cucujiformia
- Family: Cerambycidae
- Genus: Periboeum
- Species: P. acuminatum

Binomial name
- Periboeum acuminatum (Thomson, 1860)

Species of beetle

Periboeum acuminatum is a species of beetle in the family Cerambycidae. It was described by Thomson in 1860.
