= Minipsyrassa =

Scientific classification
- Kingdom: Animalia
- Phylum: Arthropoda
- Class: Insecta
- Order: Coleoptera
- Suborder: Polyphaga
- Infraorder: Cucujiformia
- Family: Cerambycidae
- Tribe: Elaphidiini
- Genus: Minipsyrassa

Genus of beetle

Minipsyrassa is a genus of beetles in the family Cerambycidae, containing the following species:

- Minipsyrassa bicolor Martins, 1974
- Minipsyrassa guanabarina Martins & Napp, 1992
