= Amethysphaerion jocosum =

Scientific classification
- Kingdom: Animalia
- Phylum: Arthropoda
- Class: Insecta
- Order: Coleoptera
- Suborder: Polyphaga
- Infraorder: Cucujiformia
- Family: Cerambycidae
- Genus: Amethysphaerion
- Species: A. jocosum

Binomial name
- Amethysphaerion jocosum Martins & Napp, 1992

Species of beetle

Amethysphaerion jocosum is a species of beetle in the family Cerambycidae. It was described by Martins and Napp in 1992.
