= Periboeum atylodes =

Scientific classification
- Kingdom: Animalia
- Phylum: Arthropoda
- Class: Insecta
- Order: Coleoptera
- Suborder: Polyphaga
- Infraorder: Cucujiformia
- Family: Cerambycidae
- Genus: Periboeum
- Species: P. atylodes

Binomial name
- Periboeum atylodes Salvador, 1978

Species of beetle

Periboeum atylodes is a species of beetle in the family Cerambycidae. It was described by Salvador in 1978.
