= Nyssicostylus =

Scientific classification
- Kingdom: Animalia
- Phylum: Arthropoda
- Class: Insecta
- Order: Coleoptera
- Suborder: Polyphaga
- Infraorder: Cucujiformia
- Family: Cerambycidae
- Subfamily: Cerambycinae
- Tribe: Elaphidiini
- Genus: Nyssicostylus; Melzer, 1923

Genus of beetles

Nyssicostylus is a genus of beetles in the family Cerambycidae, containing the following species:

- Nyssicostylus melzeri Chemsak & Martins, 1966
- Nyssicostylus overali Galileo & Martins, 1990
- Nyssicostylus paraba Martins, 2005
- Nyssicostylus subopacus (Bates, 1885)
