= Conosphaeron spinipenne =

Scientific classification
- Kingdom: Animalia
- Phylum: Arthropoda
- Class: Insecta
- Order: Coleoptera
- Suborder: Polyphaga
- Infraorder: Cucujiformia
- Family: Cerambycidae
- Genus: Conosphaeron
- Species: C. spinipenne

Binomial name
- Conosphaeron spinipenne Chemsak & Linsley, 1967

Species of beetle

Conosphaeron spinipenne is a species of beetle in the family Cerambycidae. It was described by Chemsak and Linsley in 1967.
