= Nesanoplium puberulum =

Scientific classification
- Kingdom: Animalia
- Phylum: Arthropoda
- Class: Insecta
- Order: Coleoptera
- Suborder: Polyphaga
- Infraorder: Cucujiformia
- Family: Cerambycidae
- Genus: Nesanoplium
- Species: N. puberulum

Binomial name
- Nesanoplium puberulum (Fleutiaux & Sallé, 1889)

Species of beetle

Nesanoplium puberulum is a species of beetle in the family Cerambycidae. It was described by Fleutiaux and Sallé in 1889.
