= Mallocera simplex =

Scientific classification
- Kingdom: Animalia
- Phylum: Arthropoda
- Class: Insecta
- Order: Coleoptera
- Suborder: Polyphaga
- Infraorder: Cucujiformia
- Family: Cerambycidae
- Genus: Mallocera
- Species: M. simplex

Binomial name
- Mallocera simplex White, 1853

Species of beetle

Mallocera simplex is a species of beetle in the family Cerambycidae. It was described by White in 1853.
