= Pantonyssus =

Scientific classification
- Kingdom: Animalia
- Phylum: Arthropoda
- Class: Insecta
- Order: Coleoptera
- Suborder: Polyphaga
- Infraorder: Cucujiformia
- Family: Cerambycidae
- Subfamily: Cerambycinae
- Tribe: Elaphidiini
- Genus: Pantonyssus; Bates, 1870

Genus of beetles

Pantonyssus is a genus of beetles in the family Cerambycidae, containing the following species:

- Pantonyssus bitinctus Gounelle, 1909
- Pantonyssus erichsonii (White, 1853)
- Pantonyssus flavipes Fisher, 1944
- Pantonyssus glabricollis Fuchs, 1961
- Pantonyssus nigriceps Bates, 1870
- Pantonyssus obscurus Martins, 2005
- Pantonyssus pallidus Martins, 1995
- Pantonyssus puncticollis Martins, 1995
- Pantonyssus santossilvai Martins, 2005
