= Neaneflus =

Scientific classification
- Kingdom: Animalia
- Phylum: Arthropoda
- Class: Insecta
- Order: Coleoptera
- Suborder: Polyphaga
- Infraorder: Cucujiformia
- Family: Cerambycidae
- Tribe: Elaphidiini
- Genus: Neaneflus

Genus of beetle

Neaneflus is a genus of beetles in the family Cerambycidae, containing the following species:

- Neaneflus brevispinus Chemsak, 1962
- Neaneflus fuchsii (Wickham, 1905)
