= Periboeum aduncum =

Scientific classification
- Kingdom: Animalia
- Phylum: Arthropoda
- Class: Insecta
- Order: Coleoptera
- Suborder: Polyphaga
- Infraorder: Cucujiformia
- Family: Cerambycidae
- Genus: Periboeum
- Species: P. aduncum

Binomial name
- Periboeum aduncum Napp & Martins, 1984

Species of beetle

Periboeum aduncum is a species of beetle in the family Cerambycidae. It was described by Napp and Martins in 1984.
