= Appula santarensis =

Scientific classification
- Domain: Eukaryota
- Kingdom: Animalia
- Phylum: Arthropoda
- Class: Insecta
- Order: Coleoptera
- Suborder: Polyphaga
- Infraorder: Cucujiformia
- Family: Cerambycidae
- Genus: Appula
- Species: A. santarensis

Binomial name
- Appula santarensis Franceschini, 2002

Species of beetle

Appula santarensis is a species of beetle in the family Cerambycidae. It was described by Franceschini in 2002.
