= Paranyssicus =

Scientific classification
- Kingdom: Animalia
- Phylum: Arthropoda
- Class: Insecta
- Order: Coleoptera
- Suborder: Polyphaga
- Infraorder: Cucujiformia
- Family: Cerambycidae
- Tribe: Elaphidiini
- Genus: Paranyssicus

Genus of beetles

Paranyssicus is a genus of beetles in the family Cerambycidae, containing the following species:

- Paranyssicus conspicillatus (Erichson, 1847)
- Paranyssicus tresorensis Dalens, 2011
