= Periboeum paucispinum =

Scientific classification
- Kingdom: Animalia
- Phylum: Arthropoda
- Class: Insecta
- Order: Coleoptera
- Suborder: Polyphaga
- Infraorder: Cucujiformia
- Family: Cerambycidae
- Genus: Periboeum
- Species: P. paucispinum

Binomial name
- Periboeum paucispinum (Lameere, 1890)

Species of beetle

Periboeum paucispinum is a species of beetle in the family Cerambycidae. It was described by Lameere in 1890.
