= Amethysphaerion falsus =

Scientific classification
- Kingdom: Animalia
- Phylum: Arthropoda
- Class: Insecta
- Order: Coleoptera
- Suborder: Polyphaga
- Infraorder: Cucujiformia
- Family: Cerambycidae
- Genus: Amethysphaerion
- Species: A. falsus

Binomial name
- Amethysphaerion falsus Martins, 1995

Species of beetle

Amethysphaerion falsus is a species of beetle in the family Cerambycidae. It was described by Martins in 1995.
