= Micropsyrassa opaca =

Scientific classification
- Domain: Eukaryota
- Kingdom: Animalia
- Phylum: Arthropoda
- Class: Insecta
- Order: Coleoptera
- Suborder: Polyphaga
- Infraorder: Cucujiformia
- Family: Cerambycidae
- Genus: Micropsyrassa
- Species: M. opaca

Binomial name
- Micropsyrassa opaca Martins & Chemsak, 1966

Species of beetle

Micropsyrassa opaca is a species of beetle in the family Cerambycidae. It was described by Martins and Chemsak in 1966.
