= Mephritus apicepullus =

Scientific classification
- Kingdom: Animalia
- Phylum: Arthropoda
- Class: Insecta
- Order: Coleoptera
- Suborder: Polyphaga
- Infraorder: Cucujiformia
- Family: Cerambycidae
- Genus: Mephritus
- Species: M. apicepullus

Binomial name
- Mephritus apicepullus Galileo & Martins, 2011

Species of beetle

Mephritus apicepullus is a species of beetle in the family Cerambycidae. It was described by Galileo and Martins in 2011.
