= Jampruca nigricornis =

Scientific classification
- Domain: Eukaryota
- Kingdom: Animalia
- Phylum: Arthropoda
- Class: Insecta
- Order: Coleoptera
- Suborder: Polyphaga
- Infraorder: Cucujiformia
- Family: Cerambycidae
- Genus: Jampruca
- Species: J. nigricornis

Binomial name
- Jampruca nigricornis Napp & Martins, 1982

Species of beetle

Jampruca nigricornis is a species of beetle in the family Cerambycidae. It was described by Napp and Martins in 1982.
