= Paranyssicus conspicillatus =

Scientific classification
- Kingdom: Animalia
- Phylum: Arthropoda
- Class: Insecta
- Order: Coleoptera
- Suborder: Polyphaga
- Infraorder: Cucujiformia
- Family: Cerambycidae
- Genus: Paranyssicus
- Species: P. conspicillatus

Binomial name
- Paranyssicus conspicillatus (Erichson, 1847)

Species of beetle

Paranyssicus conspicillatus is a species of beetle in the family Cerambycidae. It was described by Wilhelm Ferdinand Erichson in 1847.
