= Nesiosphaerion caymanensis =

Scientific classification
- Kingdom: Animalia
- Phylum: Arthropoda
- Class: Insecta
- Order: Coleoptera
- Suborder: Polyphaga
- Infraorder: Cucujiformia
- Family: Cerambycidae
- Genus: Nesiosphaerion
- Species: N. caymanensis

Binomial name
- Nesiosphaerion caymanensis (Fisher, 1948)

Species of beetle

Nesiosphaerion caymanensis is a species of beetle in the family Cerambycidae. It was described by Fisher in 1948.
