= Periboeum vicinum =

Scientific classification
- Kingdom: Animalia
- Phylum: Arthropoda
- Class: Insecta
- Order: Coleoptera
- Suborder: Polyphaga
- Infraorder: Cucujiformia
- Family: Cerambycidae
- Genus: Periboeum
- Species: P. vicinum

Binomial name
- Periboeum vicinum (Perroud, 1855)

Species of beetle

Periboeum vicinum is a species of beetle in the family Cerambycidae. It was described by Perroud in 1855.
