= Pilisphaerion =

Pilisphaerion exoticum

Scientific classification
- Kingdom: Animalia
- Phylum: Arthropoda
- Class: Insecta
- Order: Coleoptera
- Suborder: Polyphaga
- Infraorder: Cucujiformia
- Family: Cerambycidae
- Genus: Pilisphaerion
- Species: P. exoticum

Binomial name
- Pilisphaerion exoticum Martins & Napp, 1992

Genus of beetles

Pilisphaerion exoticum is a species of beetle in the family Cerambycidae, the only species in the genus Pilisphaerion.
