= Astromula =

Astromula nitidum

Scientific classification
- Kingdom: Animalia
- Phylum: Arthropoda
- Class: Insecta
- Order: Coleoptera
- Suborder: Polyphaga
- Infraorder: Cucujiformia
- Family: Cerambycidae
- Genus: Astromula
- Species: A. nitidum

Binomial name
- Astromula nitidum Chemsak & Linsley, 1965

Genus of beetles

Astromula nitidum is a species of beetle in the family Cerambycidae, the only species in the genus Astromula.
