= Nesodes =

Nesodes insularis

Scientific classification
- Kingdom: Animalia
- Phylum: Arthropoda
- Class: Insecta
- Order: Coleoptera
- Suborder: Polyphaga
- Infraorder: Cucujiformia
- Family: Cerambycidae
- Genus: Nesodes
- Species: N. insularis

Binomial name
- Nesodes insularis Linsley, 1935

Species of beetles

Nesodes insularis is a species of beetle in the family Cerambycidae, the only species in the genus Nesodes.
