= Urorcites =

Urorcites cribripennis

Scientific classification
- Kingdom: Animalia
- Phylum: Arthropoda
- Class: Insecta
- Order: Coleoptera
- Suborder: Polyphaga
- Infraorder: Cucujiformia
- Family: Cerambycidae
- Genus: Urorcites
- Species: U. cribripennis

Binomial name
- Urorcites cribripennis Thomson, 1878

Genus of beetles

Urorcites cribripennis is a species of beetle in the family Cerambycidae, the only species in the genus Urorcites.
