= Protomallocera =

Protomallocera hilairei

Scientific classification
- Kingdom: Animalia
- Phylum: Arthropoda
- Class: Insecta
- Order: Coleoptera
- Suborder: Polyphaga
- Infraorder: Cucujiformia
- Family: Cerambycidae
- Genus: Protomallocera
- Species: P. hilairei

Binomial name
- Protomallocera hilairei (Gounelle, 1909)

Genus of beetles

Protomallocera hilairei is a species of beetle in the family Cerambycidae, the only species in the genus Protomallocera.
