= Micraneflus =

Micraneflus imbellis

Scientific classification
- Kingdom: Animalia
- Phylum: Arthropoda
- Class: Insecta
- Order: Coleoptera
- Suborder: Polyphaga
- Infraorder: Cucujiformia
- Family: Cerambycidae
- Genus: Micraneflus
- Species: M. imbellis

Binomial name
- Micraneflus imbellis (Casey, 1914)

Genus of beetles

Micraneflus imbellis is a species of beetle in the family Cerambycidae, the only species in the genus Micraneflus.
