= Stenelaphus =

Stenelaphus alienus

Scientific classification
- Kingdom: Animalia
- Phylum: Arthropoda
- Class: Insecta
- Order: Coleoptera
- Suborder: Polyphaga
- Infraorder: Cucujiformia
- Family: Cerambycidae
- Genus: Stenelaphus
- Species: S. alienus

Binomial name
- Stenelaphus alienus (LeConte, 1875)

Genus of beetles

Stenelaphus alienus is a species of beetle in the family Cerambycidae, the only species in the genus Stenelaphus.
