= Poecilomallus =

Poecilomallus palpalis

Scientific classification
- Kingdom: Animalia
- Phylum: Arthropoda
- Class: Insecta
- Order: Coleoptera
- Suborder: Polyphaga
- Infraorder: Cucujiformia
- Family: Cerambycidae
- Genus: Poecilomallus
- Species: P. palpalis

Binomial name
- Poecilomallus palpalis Bates, 1892

Genus cof beetles

Poecilomallus palpalis is a species of beetle in the family Cerambycidae, the only species in the genus Poecilomallus.
