= Pseudomallocera =

Pseudomallocera auriflua

Scientific classification
- Kingdom: Animalia
- Phylum: Arthropoda
- Class: Insecta
- Order: Coleoptera
- Suborder: Polyphaga
- Infraorder: Cucujiformia
- Family: Cerambycidae
- Genus: Pseudomallocera
- Species: P. auriflua

Binomial name
- Pseudomallocera auriflua (Klug, 1825)

Genus of beetles

Pseudomallocera auriflua is a species of beetle in the family Cerambycidae, the only species in the genus Pseudomallocera.
