= Parapantonyssus =

Parapantonyssus ipiri

Scientific classification
- Kingdom: Animalia
- Phylum: Arthropoda
- Class: Insecta
- Order: Coleoptera
- Suborder: Polyphaga
- Infraorder: Cucujiformia
- Family: Cerambycidae
- Genus: Parapantonyssus
- Species: P. ipiri

Binomial name
- Parapantonyssus ipiri Galileo & Martins, 2010

Genus of beetles

Parapantonyssus ipiri is a species of beetle in the family Cerambycidae, the only species in the genus Parapantonyssus.
