= Apoclausirion =

Apoclausirion nigricorne

Scientific classification
- Kingdom: Animalia
- Phylum: Arthropoda
- Class: Insecta
- Order: Coleoptera
- Suborder: Polyphaga
- Infraorder: Cucujiformia
- Family: Cerambycidae
- Genus: Apoclausirion
- Species: A. nigricorne

Binomial name
- Apoclausirion nigricorne Martins & Napp, 1992

Genus of beetles

Apoclausirion nigricorne is a species of beetle in the family Cerambycidae, the only species in the genus Apoclausirion.
