= Etymosphaerion =

Etymosphaerion unicolor

Scientific classification
- Kingdom: Animalia
- Phylum: Arthropoda
- Class: Insecta
- Order: Coleoptera
- Suborder: Polyphaga
- Infraorder: Cucujiformia
- Family: Cerambycidae
- Genus: Etymosphaerion
- Species: E. unicolor

Binomial name
- Etymosphaerion unicolor Martins & Monné, 1975

Genus of beetles

Etymosphaerion unicolor is a species of beetle in the family Cerambycidae, the only species in the genus Etymosphaerion.
