= Miltesthus =

Miltesthus marginatus

Scientific classification
- Kingdom: Animalia
- Phylum: Arthropoda
- Class: Insecta
- Order: Coleoptera
- Suborder: Polyphaga
- Infraorder: Cucujiformia
- Family: Cerambycidae
- Genus: Miltesthus
- Species: M. marginatus

Binomial name
- Miltesthus marginatus Bates, 1872

Genus of beetle

Miltesthus marginatus is a species of beetle in the family Cerambycidae, the only species in the genus Miltesthus.
