= Meganeflus =

Meganeflus fulvipennis

Scientific classification
- Kingdom: Animalia
- Phylum: Arthropoda
- Class: Insecta
- Order: Coleoptera
- Suborder: Polyphaga
- Infraorder: Cucujiformia
- Family: Cerambycidae
- Genus: Meganeflus
- Species: M. fulvipennis

Binomial name
- Meganeflus fulvipennis (Bates, 1892)

Genus of beetles

Meganeflus fallax is a species of beetle in the family Cerambycidae, the only species in the genus Meganeflus.
