= Parastizocera =

Parastizocera procera

Scientific classification
- Kingdom: Animalia
- Phylum: Arthropoda
- Class: Insecta
- Order: Coleoptera
- Suborder: Polyphaga
- Infraorder: Cucujiformia
- Family: Cerambycidae
- Genus: Parastizocera
- Species: P. procera

Binomial name
- Parastizocera procera (Erichson in Schomburg, 1848)

Genus of beetles

Parastizocera procera is a species of beetle in the family Cerambycidae, the only species in the genus Parastizocera.
