= Cotyperiboeum =

Cotyperiboeum antennarium

Scientific classification
- Kingdom: Animalia
- Phylum: Arthropoda
- Class: Insecta
- Order: Coleoptera
- Suborder: Polyphaga
- Infraorder: Cucujiformia
- Family: Cerambycidae
- Genus: Cotyperiboeum
- Species: C. antennarium

Binomial name
- Cotyperiboeum antennarium Galileo & Martins, 2010

Genus of beetles

Cotyperiboeum antennarium is a species of beetle in the family Cerambycidae, the only species in the genus Cotyperiboeum.
