= Iuaca =

Iuaca nigromaculata

Scientific classification
- Kingdom: Animalia
- Phylum: Arthropoda
- Class: Insecta
- Order: Coleoptera
- Suborder: Polyphaga
- Infraorder: Cucujiformia
- Family: Cerambycidae
- Genus: Iuaca
- Species: I. nigromaculata

Binomial name
- Iuaca nigromaculata Galileo & Martins, 2000

Genus of beetles

Iuaca nigromaculata is a species of beetle in the family Cerambycidae, the only species in the genus Iuaca.
