= Lanephus =

Lanephus njumanii

Scientific classification
- Kingdom: Animalia
- Phylum: Arthropoda
- Class: Insecta
- Order: Coleoptera
- Suborder: Polyphaga
- Infraorder: Cucujiformia
- Family: Cerambycidae
- Genus: Lanephus
- Species: L. njumanii

Binomial name
- Lanephus njumanii (Haldeman, 1847)

Genus of beetles

Lanephus njumanii is a species of beetle in the family Cerambycidae, the only species in the genus Lanephus.
