= Sphaerioeme =

Sphaerioeme rubristerna

Scientific classification
- Kingdom: Animalia
- Phylum: Arthropoda
- Class: Insecta
- Order: Coleoptera
- Suborder: Polyphaga
- Infraorder: Cucujiformia
- Family: Cerambycidae
- Genus: Sphaerioeme
- Species: S. rubristerna

Binomial name
- Sphaerioeme rubristerna Martins & Napp, 1992

Genus of beetles

Sphaerioeme rubristerna is a species of beetle in the family Cerambycidae, the only species in the genus Sphaerioeme.
