= Magaliella =

Magaliella punctata

Scientific classification
- Kingdom: Animalia
- Phylum: Arthropoda
- Class: Insecta
- Order: Coleoptera
- Suborder: Polyphaga
- Infraorder: Cucujiformia
- Family: Cerambycidae
- Genus: Magaliella
- Species: M. punctata

Binomial name
- Magaliella punctata Galileo & Martins, 2008

Genus of beetles

Magaliella punctata is a species of beetle in the family Cerambycidae, the only species in the genus Magaliella.
