= Parasphaerion =

Parasphaerion granulosum

Scientific classification
- Kingdom: Animalia
- Phylum: Arthropoda
- Class: Insecta
- Order: Coleoptera
- Suborder: Polyphaga
- Infraorder: Cucujiformia
- Family: Cerambycidae
- Genus: Parasphaerion
- Species: P. granulosum

Binomial name
- Parasphaerion granulosum Martins & Napp, 1992

Genus of beetles

Parasphaerion granulosum is a species of beetle in the family Cerambycidae, the only species in the genus Parasphaerion.
