= Micranoplium =

Micranoplium unicolor

Scientific classification
- Kingdom: Animalia
- Phylum: Arthropoda
- Class: Insecta
- Order: Coleoptera
- Suborder: Polyphaga
- Infraorder: Cucujiformia
- Family: Cerambycidae
- Genus: Micranoplium
- Species: M. unicolor

Binomial name
- Micranoplium unicolor (Haldeman, 1847)

Genus of beetles

Micranoplium unicolor is a species of beetle in the family Cerambycidae, the only species in the genus Micranoplium.
