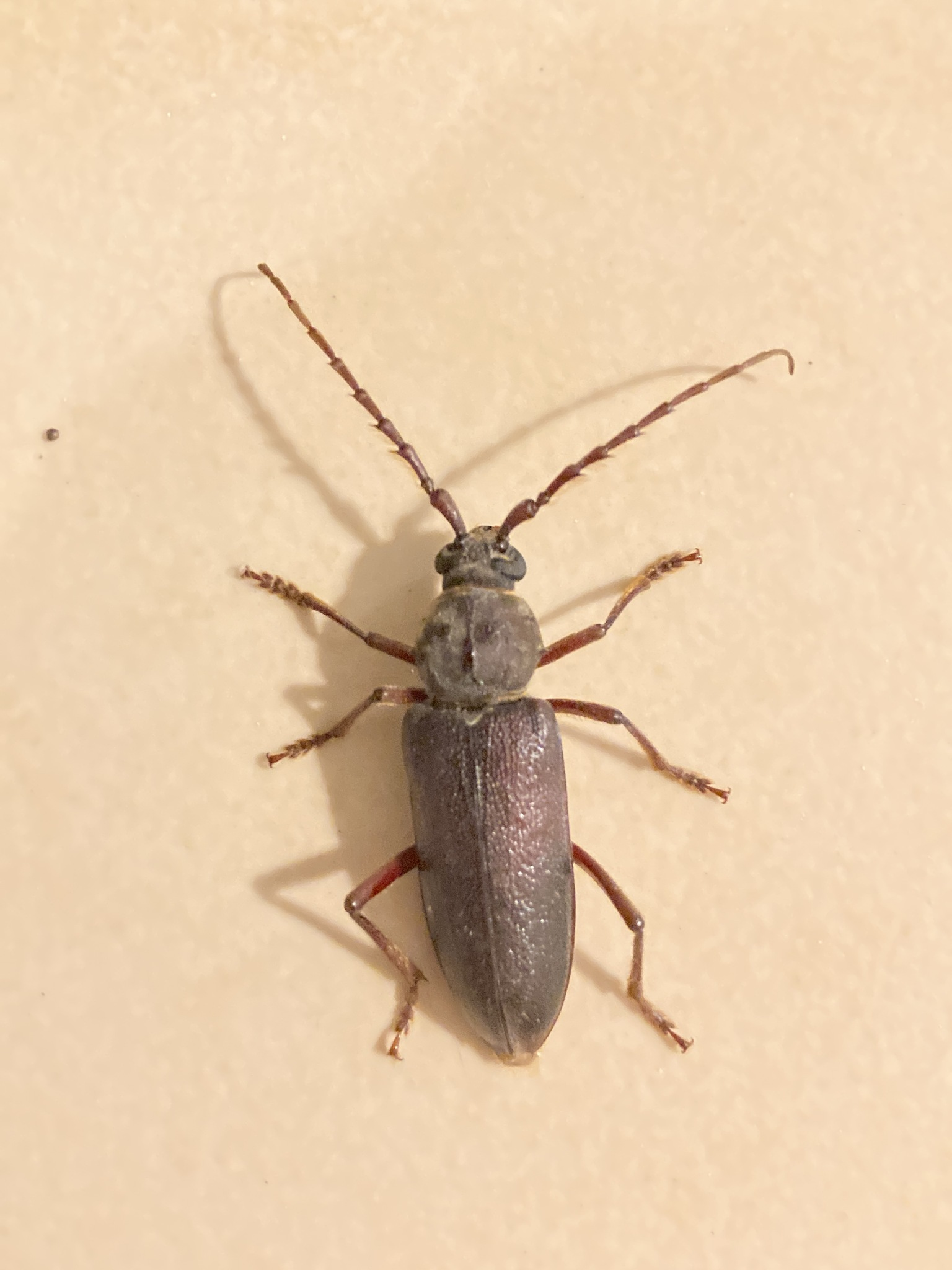
- Orion maurus, Argentina

Scientific classification
- Kingdom: Animalia
- Phylum: Arthropoda
- Class: Insecta
- Order: Coleoptera
- Suborder: Polyphaga
- Infraorder: Cucujiformia
- Family: Cerambycidae
- Subfamily: Cerambycinae
- Tribe: Phoracanthini
- Genus: Orion
- Species: O. maurus

Binomial name
- Orion maurus (Newman, 1841)

Synonyms
- Elaphidion maurum Newman, 1841; Hypermallus maurus Gemminger & Harold, 1872; Orion brunneum Blackwelder, 1946; Orion brunneus Monné & Giesbert, 1994; Orion lachesis White, 1853; Orion lacordairei Blackwelder, 1946; Orion maurum Blackwelder, 1946; Orion patagonius Lingafelter, 1998; Orion patagonum Blackwelder, 1946; Orion patagonus Ruffinelli, 1967

= Orion maurus =

Genus of beetles

Orion maurus is a species of longhorn beetle in the family Cerambycidae, found in South America.
