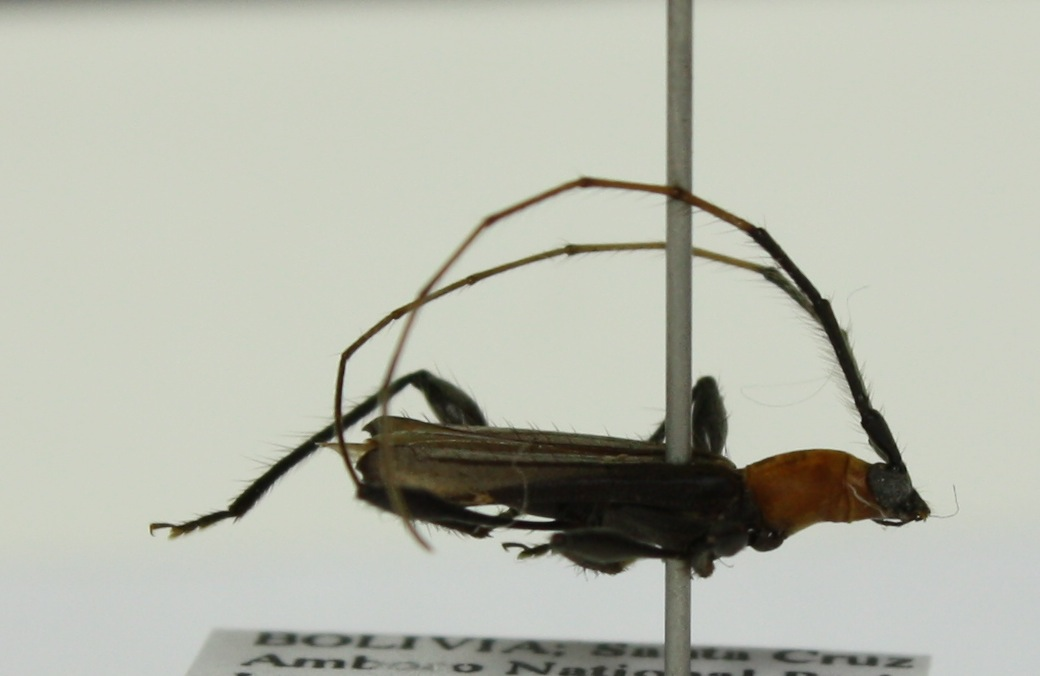
- Terpnissa listropterina collected by Dr. Maxwell Barclay

Scientific classification
- Kingdom: Animalia
- Phylum: Arthropoda
- Class: Insecta
- Order: Coleoptera
- Suborder: Polyphaga
- Infraorder: Cucujiformia
- Family: Cerambycidae
- Genus: Terpnissa
- Species: T. listropterina

Binomial name
- Terpnissa listropterina Bates, 1867

= Terpnissa =

Terpnissa listropterina

Genus of beetles

Terpnissa listropterina is a species of beetle in the family Cerambycidae, the only species in the genus Terpnissa.
