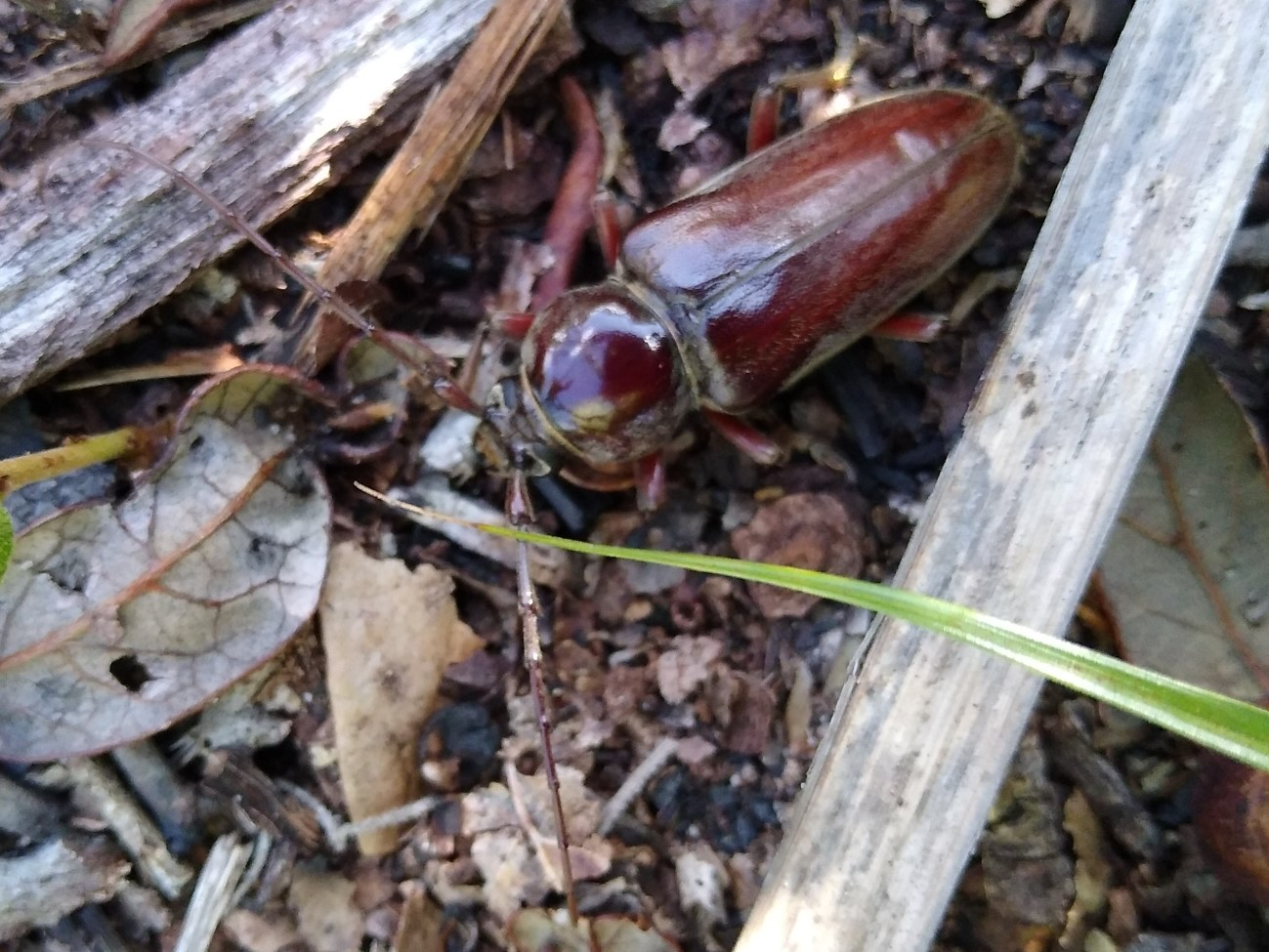

Scientific classification
- Domain: Eukaryota
- Kingdom: Animalia
- Phylum: Arthropoda
- Class: Insecta
- Order: Coleoptera
- Suborder: Polyphaga
- Infraorder: Cucujiformia
- Family: Cerambycidae
- Genus: Romulus; Knull, 1948
- Species: R. globosus

Binomial name
- Romulus globosus Knull, 1948

= Romulus globosus =

Genus of beetles

Romulus globosus is a species of beetle in the family Cerambycidae, the only species in the genus Romulus.
