= Mephritus =

Scientific classification
- Missing taxonomy template (fix): Mephritus

Synonyms
- Nephalius Gounelle, 1907

Genus of beetles

Mephritus is a genus of beetles in the family Cerambycidae, containing the following species:

- Mephritus adelphus (Martins, 1973)
- Mephritus amictus (Newman, 1841)
- Mephritus apicatus (Linsley, 1935)
- Mephritus apicepullus Galileo & Martins, 2011
- Mephritus auricolle Tavakilian & Martins, 1991
- Mephritus blandus (Newman, 1841)
- Mephritus bonasoi Galileo, Martins & Santos-Silva, 2014
- Mephritus callidioides (Bates, 1870)
- Mephritus castaneus Martins & Napp, 1992
- Mephritus citreus Napp & Martins, 1982
- Mephritus costae Garcia & Nascimento, 2020
- Mephritus destitutus Napp & Martins, 1982
- Mephritus eleandroi Galileo, Martins & Santos-Silva, 2014
- Mephritus estoni Galileo & Martins, 2011
- Mephritus flavipes (Gounelle, 1909)
- Mephritus fraterculus Martins & Napp, 1992
- Mephritus genuinus Napp & Martins, 1982
- Mephritus guttatus Napp & Martins, 1982
- Mephritus hovorei Santos-Silva & Lingafelter, 2021
- Mephritus meyeri Galileo, Martins & Santos-Silva, 2014
- Mephritus punctulatus Galileo, Martins & Santos-Silva, 2014
- Mephritus quadrimaculatus Martins & Napp, 1992
- Mephritus serius (Newman, 1841)
- Mephritus vescus Galileo & Martins, 2011
