= Neomallocera =

Neomallocera opulenta

Scientific classification
- Kingdom: Animalia
- Phylum: Arthropoda
- Class: Insecta
- Order: Coleoptera
- Suborder: Polyphaga
- Infraorder: Cucujiformia
- Family: Cerambycidae
- Genus: Neomallocera
- Species: N. opulenta

Binomial name
- Neomallocera opulenta (Newman, 1841)

Genus of beetle

Neomallocera opulenta is a species of beetle in the family Cerambycidae, the only species in the genus Neomallocera.
