= Alicianella =

Alicianella quadrimaculata

Scientific classification
- Kingdom: Animalia
- Phylum: Arthropoda
- Class: Insecta
- Order: Coleoptera
- Suborder: Polyphaga
- Infraorder: Cucujiformia
- Family: Cerambycidae
- Genus: Alicianella
- Species: A. quadrimaculata

Binomial name
- Alicianella quadrimaculata (Noguera, 2005)

Genus of beetles

Alicianella quadrimaculata is a species of beetle in the family Cerambycidae, the only species in the genus Alicianella.
