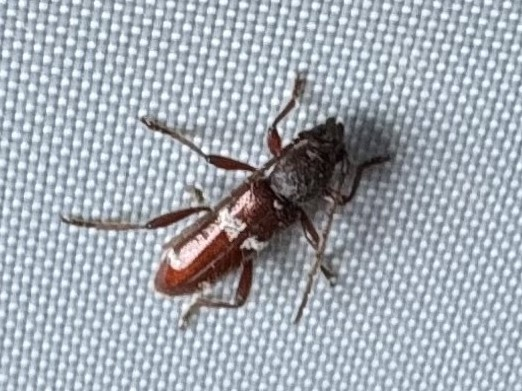

Scientific classification
- Kingdom: Animalia
- Phylum: Arthropoda
- Clade: Pancrustacea
- Class: Insecta
- Order: Coleoptera
- Suborder: Polyphaga
- Infraorder: Cucujiformia
- Family: Cerambycidae
- Genus: Elaphidionopsis; Linsley, 1936
- Species: E. fasciatipennis

Binomial name
- Elaphidionopsis fasciatipennis Linsley, 1936

= Elaphidionopsis =

Elaphidionopsis fasciatipennis

Genus of beetles

Elaphidionopsis fasciatipennis is a species of beetle in the family Cerambycidae, the only species in the genus Elaphidionopsis.
