= Morphaneflus =

Morphaneflus prolixus

Scientific classification
- Kingdom: Animalia
- Phylum: Arthropoda
- Class: Insecta
- Order: Coleoptera
- Suborder: Polyphaga
- Infraorder: Cucujiformia
- Family: Cerambycidae
- Genus: Morphaneflus
- Species: M. prolixus

Binomial name
- Morphaneflus prolixus Martins & Napp, 1992

Genus of beetle

Morphaneflus prolixus is a species of beetle in the family Cerambycidae, the only species in the genus Morphaneflus.
