= Atharsus =

Atharsus nigricauda

Scientific classification
- Kingdom: Animalia
- Phylum: Arthropoda
- Class: Insecta
- Order: Coleoptera
- Suborder: Polyphaga
- Infraorder: Cucujiformia
- Family: Cerambycidae
- Genus: Atharsus
- Species: A. nigricauda

Binomial name
- Atharsus nigricauda Bates, 1867

Genus of beetles

Atharsus nigricauda is a species of beetle in the family Cerambycidae, the only species in the genus Atharsus.
