= Anama (beetle) =

Scientific classification
- Domain: Eukaryota
- Kingdom: Animalia
- Phylum: Arthropoda
- Class: Insecta
- Order: Coleoptera
- Suborder: Polyphaga
- Infraorder: Staphyliniformia
- Family: Staphylinidae
- Subfamily: Pselaphinae
- Supertribe: Batrisitae
- Tribe: Batrisini
- Subtribe: Batrisina
- Genus: Anama; Newton & Chandler, 1989

Synonyms
- Amana Raffray, 1890

Genus of beetles

Anama is a genus of rove beetles in the family Staphylinidae. There are at least two described species in Anama.

== Species ==
These two species belong to the genus Anama:

- Anama cephalotes (Raffray, 1893) (Indonesia (Sumatra))
- Anama crassicornis (Raffray, 1890) (Singapore)
