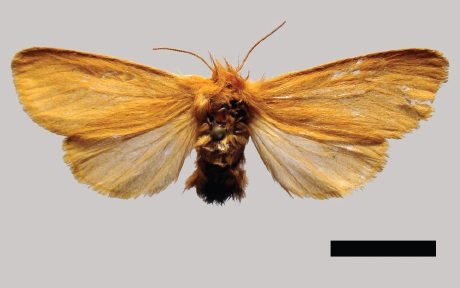

Scientific classification
- Domain: Eukaryota
- Kingdom: Animalia
- Phylum: Arthropoda
- Class: Insecta
- Order: Lepidoptera
- Superfamily: Noctuoidea
- Family: Erebidae
- Subfamily: Arctiinae
- Genus: Paracles
- Species: P. uruguayensis

Binomial name
- Paracles uruguayensis (Berg, 1886)

Synonyms
- Palustra uruguayensis Berg, 1886

= Paracles uruguayensis =

Species of moth

Paracles uruguayensis is a moth of the subfamily Arctiinae first described by Carlos Berg in 1886. It is found in Uruguay.

Adults have a pale grey-yellow pattern.

== Taxonomy ==
The species was synonymised with Paracles vulpina by George Hampson in 1901. Research in 2014 concluded it is a valid species.
