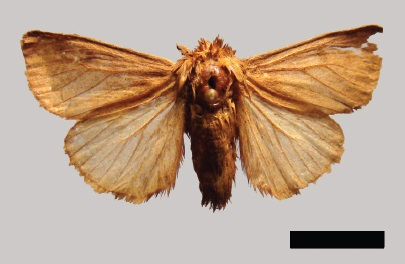

Scientific classification
- Domain: Eukaryota
- Kingdom: Animalia
- Phylum: Arthropoda
- Class: Insecta
- Order: Lepidoptera
- Superfamily: Noctuoidea
- Family: Erebidae
- Subfamily: Arctiinae
- Genus: Paracles
- Species: P. argentina

Binomial name
- Paracles argentina (Berg, 1877)

Synonyms
- Palustra argentina Berg, 1877

= Paracles argentina =

Species of moth

Paracles argentina is a moth of the subfamily Arctiinae first described by Carlos Berg in 1877. It is found in Corrientes Province, Argentina.

== Taxonomy ==
The species was treated as a synonym of Paracles laboulbeni by George Hampson in 1901. Research in 2014 concluded it is a valid species.
