= Dichomeris argentinellus =

Scientific classification
- Domain: Eukaryota
- Kingdom: Animalia
- Phylum: Arthropoda
- Class: Insecta
- Order: Lepidoptera
- Family: Gelechiidae
- Genus: Dichomeris
- Species: D. argentinellus

Binomial name
- Dichomeris argentinellus (Berg, 1885)

Synonyms
- Ypsolophus argentinellus Berg, 1885; Dichomeris argentinella Berg, 1885

Species of moth

Dichomeris argentinellus is a moth in the family Gelechiidae. It was described by Carlos Berg in 1885. It is found in Argentina.
