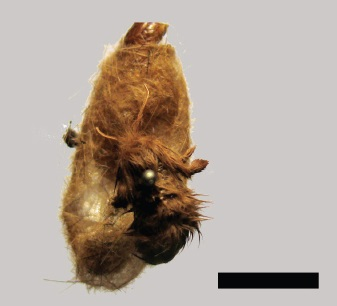

Scientific classification
- Domain: Eukaryota
- Kingdom: Animalia
- Phylum: Arthropoda
- Class: Insecta
- Order: Lepidoptera
- Superfamily: Noctuoidea
- Family: Erebidae
- Subfamily: Arctiinae
- Genus: Paracles
- Species: P. deserticola

Binomial name
- Paracles deserticola (Berg, 1875)

Synonyms
- Bombyx deserticola Berg, 1875

= Paracles deserticola =

Species of moth

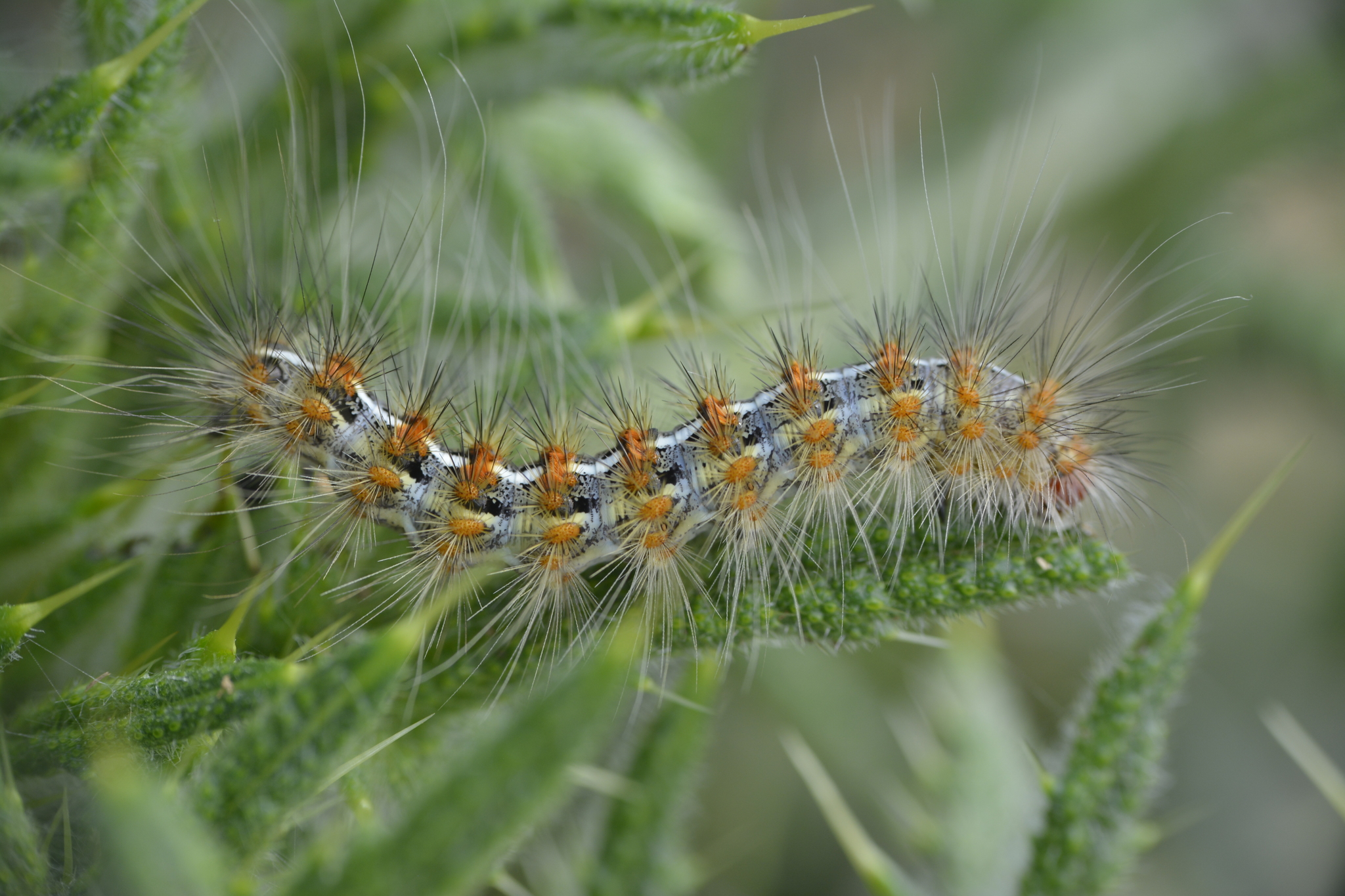
Paracles deserticola caterpillar, Argentina

Paracles deseticola is a moth of the subfamily Arctiinae first described by Carlos Berg in 1875. It is found in Argentina and Patagonia.
