= Chlanidophora patagiata =

Scientific classification
- Domain: Eukaryota
- Kingdom: Animalia
- Phylum: Arthropoda
- Class: Insecta
- Order: Lepidoptera
- Superfamily: Noctuoidea
- Family: Noctuidae
- Genus: Chlanidophora
- Species: C. patagiata

Binomial name
- Chlanidophora patagiata Berg, 1877

Species of moth

Chlanidophora patagiata is a moth of the family Noctuidae first described by Carlos Berg in 1877. It is found in Patagonia; it was historically misclassified, but in 2010 was determined to belong to the subfamily Agaristinae.
