= Pyrausta suavidalis =

Scientific classification
- Domain: Eukaryota
- Kingdom: Animalia
- Phylum: Arthropoda
- Class: Insecta
- Order: Lepidoptera
- Family: Crambidae
- Genus: Pyrausta
- Species: P. suavidalis

Binomial name
- Pyrausta suavidalis (Berg, 1899)

Synonyms
- Botys suavidalis Berg, 1899

Species of moth

Pyrausta suavidalis is a moth in the family Crambidae. It is found in Brazil.
