= Sphaerion lentiginosum =

Scientific classification
- Kingdom: Animalia
- Phylum: Arthropoda
- Class: Insecta
- Order: Coleoptera
- Suborder: Polyphaga
- Infraorder: Cucujiformia
- Family: Cerambycidae
- Genus: Sphaerion
- Species: S. lentiginosum

Binomial name
- Sphaerion lentiginosum Berg, 1889

Species of beetle

Sphaerion lentiginosum is a species of beetle in the family Cerambycidae. It was described by Carlos Berg in 1889.
