= Chlanidophora =

Scientific classification
- Domain: Eukaryota
- Kingdom: Animalia
- Phylum: Arthropoda
- Class: Insecta
- Order: Lepidoptera
- Superfamily: Noctuoidea
- Family: Noctuidae
- Subfamily: Agaristinae
- Genus: Chlanidophora; Berg, 1877

Species
- Chlanidophora albicancellata (Burmeister, 1878); Chlanidophora culleni Brèthes, 1908; Chlanidophora patagiata Berg, 1877

Synonyms
- Caridarctia Hampson, 1901

Genus of moths

Chlanidophora is a genus of moths of the family Noctuidae; it was historically misclassified, but in 2010 was determined to belong to the subfamily Agaristinae.
