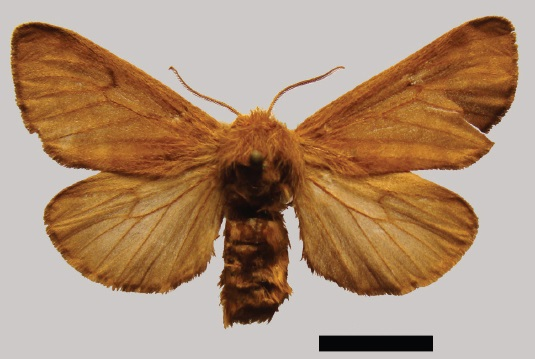
- Adult
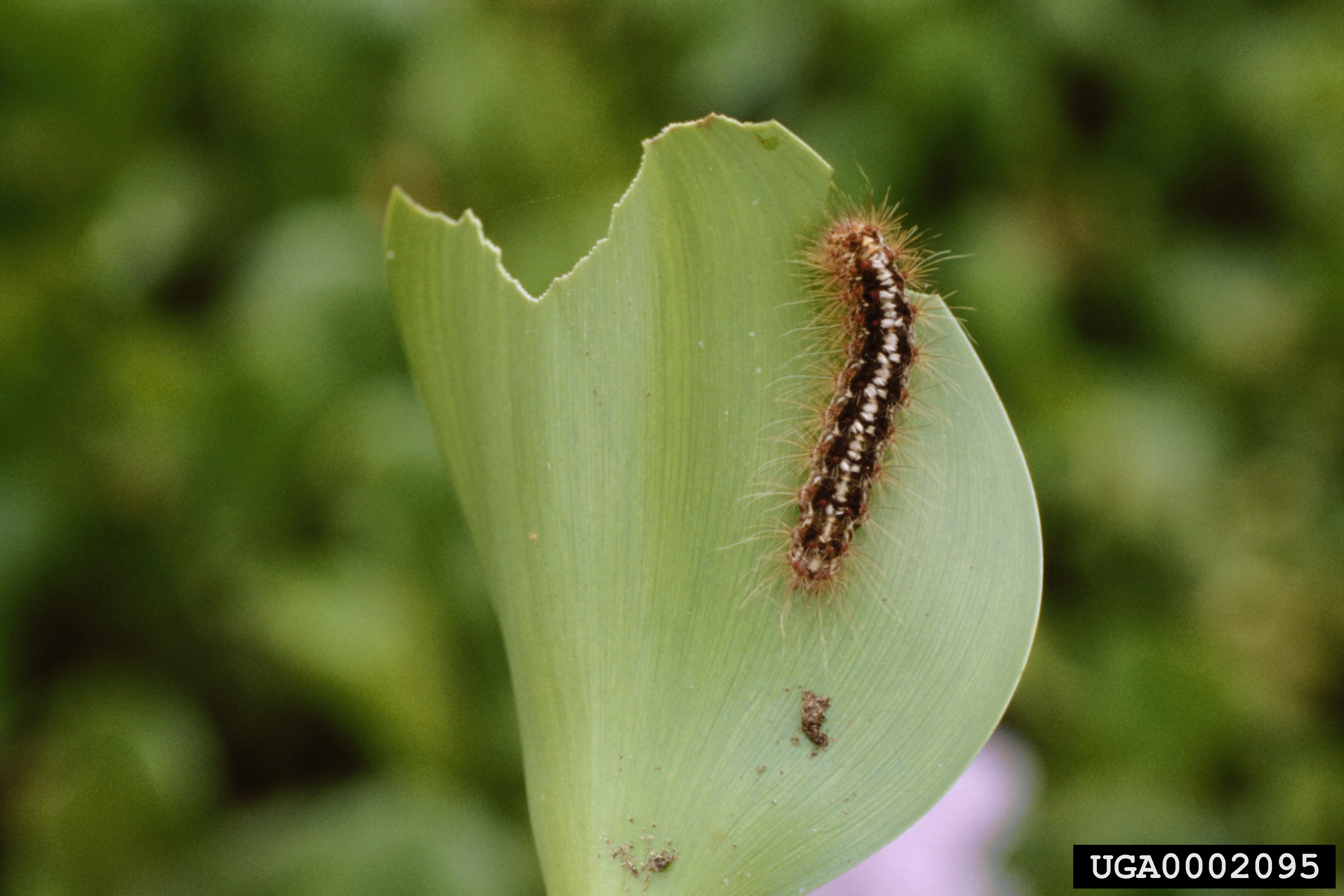
- Larva

Scientific classification
- Domain: Eukaryota
- Kingdom: Animalia
- Phylum: Arthropoda
- Class: Insecta
- Order: Lepidoptera
- Superfamily: Noctuoidea
- Family: Erebidae
- Subfamily: Arctiinae
- Genus: Paracles
- Species: P. tenuis

Binomial name
- Paracles tenuis (Berg, 1877)

Synonyms
- Palustra tenuis Berg, 1877

= Paracles tenuis =

Species of moth

Paracles tenuis is a moth of the subfamily Arctiinae first described by Carlos Berg in 1877. It is found in Argentina, Uruguay and Colombia.
