= Eurysthea hirca =

Scientific classification
- Kingdom: Animalia
- Phylum: Arthropoda
- Class: Insecta
- Order: Coleoptera
- Suborder: Polyphaga
- Infraorder: Cucujiformia
- Family: Cerambycidae
- Genus: Eurysthea
- Species: E. hirca

Binomial name
- Eurysthea hirca (Berg, 1889)

Species of beetle

Eurysthea hirca is a species of beetle in the family Cerambycidae. It was described by Carlos Berg in 1889.
