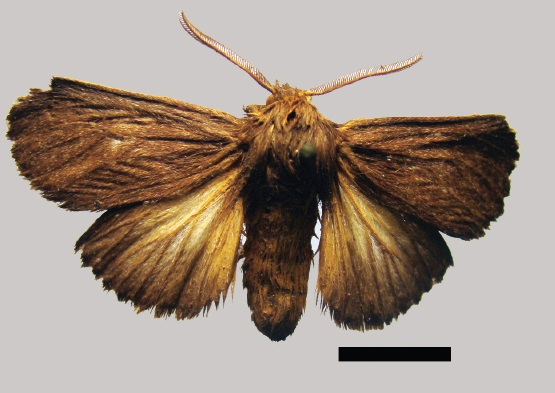

Scientific classification
- Domain: Eukaryota
- Kingdom: Animalia
- Phylum: Arthropoda
- Class: Insecta
- Order: Lepidoptera
- Superfamily: Noctuoidea
- Family: Erebidae
- Subfamily: Arctiinae
- Genus: Paracles
- Species: P. severa

Binomial name
- Paracles severa (Berg, 1875)

Synonyms
- Antarctia severa Berg, 1875

= Paracles severa =

Species of moth

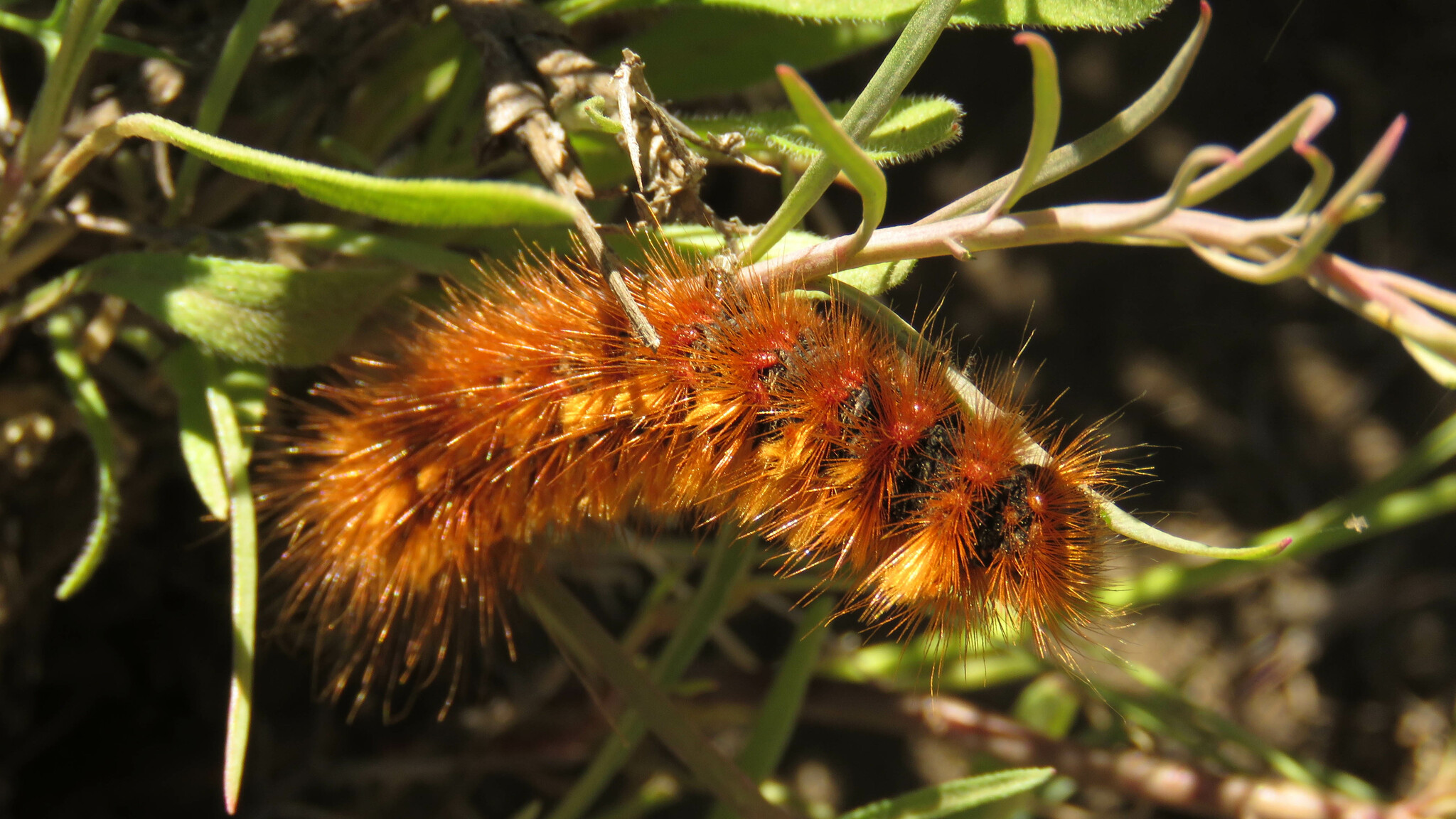
Paracles severa caterpillar, Argentina

Paracles severa is a moth of the subfamily Arctiinae first described by Carlos Berg in 1875. It is found in Argentina.
