= Stenoma uruguayensis =

Scientific classification
- Domain: Eukaryota
- Kingdom: Animalia
- Phylum: Arthropoda
- Class: Insecta
- Order: Lepidoptera
- Family: Depressariidae
- Genus: Stenoma
- Species: S. uruguayensis

Binomial name
- Stenoma uruguayensis (Berg, 1885)

Synonyms
- Cryptolechia uruguayensis Berg, 1885

Species of moth

Stenoma uruguayensis is a moth in the family Depressariidae. It was described by Carlos Berg in 1885. It is found in Uruguay.
