= Amorupi fulvoterminata =

Scientific classification
- Kingdom: Animalia
- Phylum: Arthropoda
- Class: Insecta
- Order: Coleoptera
- Suborder: Polyphaga
- Infraorder: Cucujiformia
- Family: Cerambycidae
- Genus: Amorupi
- Species: A. fulvoterminata

Binomial name
- Amorupi fulvoterminata (Berg, 1889)

Synonyms
- Mallocera fulvoterminata Berg, 1889; Paramallocera fulvoterminata Aurivillius, 1912

Species of beetle

Amorupi fulvoterminata is a species of longhorn beetle in the Elaphidiini subfamily. It was described by Carlos Berg in 1889.
