= Thoracibidion fasciiferum =

Scientific classification
- Domain: Eukaryota
- Kingdom: Animalia
- Phylum: Arthropoda
- Class: Insecta
- Order: Coleoptera
- Suborder: Polyphaga
- Infraorder: Cucujiformia
- Family: Cerambycidae
- Genus: Thoracibidion
- Species: T. fasciiferum

Binomial name
- Thoracibidion fasciiferum (Berg, 1889)

Species of beetle

Thoracibidion fasciiferum is a species of beetle in the family Cerambycidae. It was described by Carlos Berg in 1889.
