= Sphaerion inerme =

Scientific classification
- Kingdom: Animalia
- Phylum: Arthropoda
- Class: Insecta
- Order: Coleoptera
- Suborder: Polyphaga
- Infraorder: Cucujiformia
- Family: Cerambycidae
- Genus: Sphaerion
- Species: S. inerme

Binomial name
- Sphaerion inerme White, 1853

Species of beetle

Sphaerion inerme is a species of beetle in the family Cerambycidae. It was described by White in 1853.
