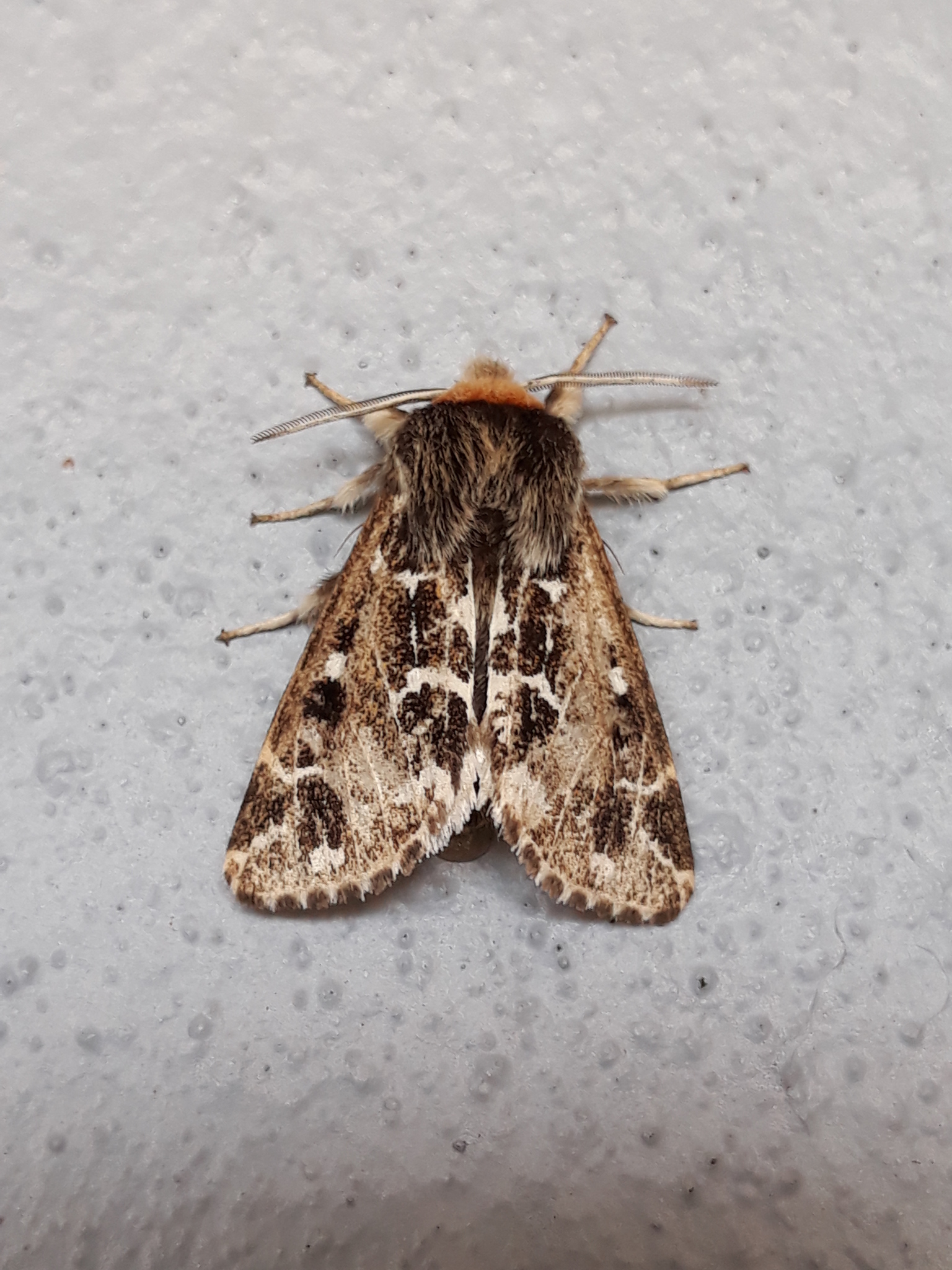
- Paracles variegata, Brazil

Scientific classification
- Domain: Eukaryota
- Kingdom: Animalia
- Phylum: Arthropoda
- Class: Insecta
- Order: Lepidoptera
- Superfamily: Noctuoidea
- Family: Erebidae
- Subfamily: Arctiinae
- Genus: Paracles
- Species: P. variegata

Binomial name
- Paracles variegata (Schaus, 1896)

Synonyms
- Motada variegata Schaus, 1896

= Paracles variegata =

Species of moth

Paracles variegata is a moth of the subfamily Arctiinae first described by Schaus in 1896. It is found in Brazil.
