= Paracles tolimensis =

Scientific classification
- Domain: Eukaryota
- Kingdom: Animalia
- Phylum: Arthropoda
- Class: Insecta
- Order: Lepidoptera
- Superfamily: Noctuoidea
- Family: Erebidae
- Subfamily: Arctiinae
- Genus: Paracles
- Species: P. tolimensis

Binomial name
- Paracles tolimensis (Dognin, 1912)

Synonyms
- Maenas tolimensis Dognin, 1912

Species of moth

Paracles tolimensis is a moth of the subfamily Arctiinae first described by Paul Dognin in 1912. It is found in Colombia.
