= Paracles peruensis =

Scientific classification
- Domain: Eukaryota
- Kingdom: Animalia
- Phylum: Arthropoda
- Class: Insecta
- Order: Lepidoptera
- Superfamily: Noctuoidea
- Family: Erebidae
- Subfamily: Arctiinae
- Genus: Paracles
- Species: P. peruensis

Binomial name
- Paracles peruensis (Dognin, 1907)

Synonyms
- Maenas peruensis Dognin, 1907

Species of moth

Paracles peruensis is a moth of the subfamily Arctiinae first described by Paul Dognin in 1907. It is found in Peru.
