= Thoracibidion galbum =

Scientific classification
- Domain: Eukaryota
- Kingdom: Animalia
- Phylum: Arthropoda
- Class: Insecta
- Order: Coleoptera
- Suborder: Polyphaga
- Infraorder: Cucujiformia
- Family: Cerambycidae
- Genus: Thoracibidion
- Species: T. galbum

Binomial name
- Thoracibidion galbum Martins, 1968

Species of beetle

Thoracibidion galbum is a species of beetle in the family Cerambycidae. It was described by Martins in 1968.
