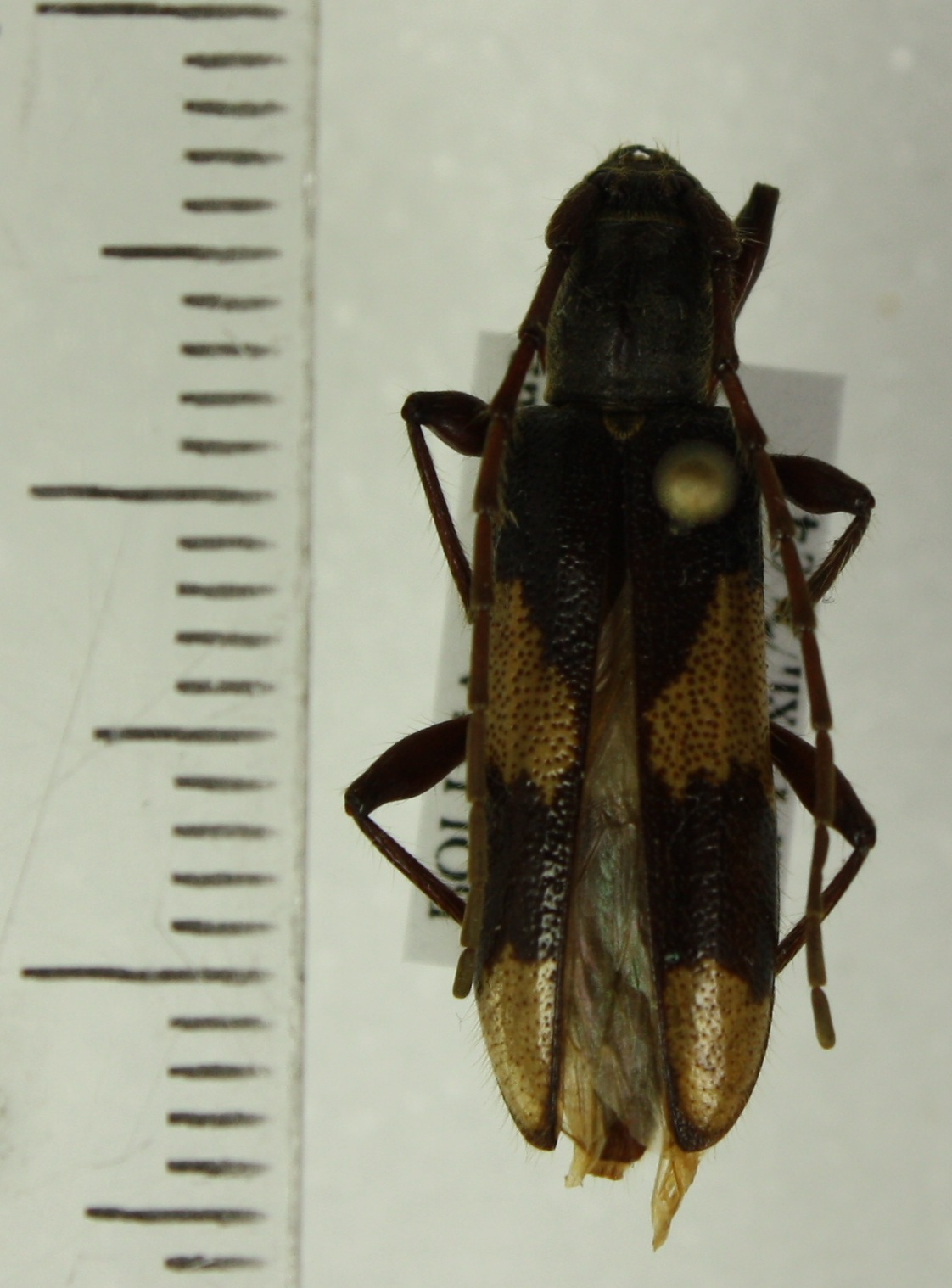
- Amorupi hudepohli

Scientific classification
- Kingdom: Animalia
- Phylum: Arthropoda
- Class: Insecta
- Order: Coleoptera
- Suborder: Polyphaga
- Infraorder: Cucujiformia
- Family: Cerambycidae
- Tribe: Elaphidiini
- Genus: Amorupi

= Amorupi =

Genus of beetles

Amorupi is a genus of beetles in the family Cerambycidae, containing the following species:

- Amorupi fulvoterminata (Berg, 1889)
- Amorupi hudepohli (Martins, 1974)
