= Paracles insipida =

Scientific classification
- Domain: Eukaryota
- Kingdom: Animalia
- Phylum: Arthropoda
- Class: Insecta
- Order: Lepidoptera
- Superfamily: Noctuoidea
- Family: Erebidae
- Subfamily: Arctiinae
- Genus: Paracles
- Species: P. insipida

Binomial name
- Paracles insipida (Rothschild, 1910)

Synonyms
- Mallocephala insipida Rothschild, 1910

Species of moth

Paracles insipida is a moth of the subfamily Arctiinae first described by Rothschild in 1910. It is found in Argentina.
