= Paracles fosteri =

Scientific classification
- Kingdom: Animalia
- Phylum: Arthropoda
- Class: Insecta
- Order: Lepidoptera
- Superfamily: Noctuoidea
- Family: Erebidae
- Subfamily: Arctiinae
- Tribe: Arctiini
- Subtribe: Spilosomina
- Genus: Paracles
- Species: P. fosteri

Binomial name
- Paracles fosteri (Hampson, 1905)

Synonyms
- Maenas fosteri Hampson, 1905

Species of moth

Paracles discalis is a moth of the subfamily Arctiinae first described by George Hampson in 1905. It is found in Paraguay.
