= Paracles elongata =

Scientific classification
- Domain: Eukaryota
- Kingdom: Animalia
- Phylum: Arthropoda
- Class: Insecta
- Order: Lepidoptera
- Superfamily: Noctuoidea
- Family: Erebidae
- Subfamily: Arctiinae
- Genus: Paracles
- Species: P. elongata

Binomial name
- Paracles elongata (Rothschild, 1922)

Synonyms
- Palustra elongata Rothschild, 1922

Species of moth

Paracles elongata is a moth of the subfamily Arctiinae first described by Rothschild in 1922. It is found in Peru.
