= Paracles albescens =

Scientific classification
- Kingdom: Animalia
- Phylum: Arthropoda
- Class: Insecta
- Order: Lepidoptera
- Superfamily: Noctuoidea
- Family: Erebidae
- Subfamily: Arctiinae
- Genus: Paracles
- Species: P. albescens

Binomial name
- Paracles albescens (Hampson, 1901)

Synonyms
- Maenas albescens Hampson, 1901

Species of moth

Paracles albescens is a moth of the subfamily Arctiinae first described by George Hampson in 1901. It is found in Venezuela and Peru.
