= Eurysthea martinsi =

Scientific classification
- Kingdom: Animalia
- Phylum: Arthropoda
- Class: Insecta
- Order: Coleoptera
- Suborder: Polyphaga
- Infraorder: Cucujiformia
- Family: Cerambycidae
- Genus: Eurysthea
- Species: E. martinsi

Binomial name
- Eurysthea martinsi (Fonseca-Gessner, 1990)

Species of beetle

Eurysthea martinsi is a species of beetle in the family Cerambycidae. It was described by Fonseca-Gessner in 1990.
