= Paracles phaeocera =

Scientific classification
- Kingdom: Animalia
- Phylum: Arthropoda
- Class: Insecta
- Order: Lepidoptera
- Superfamily: Noctuoidea
- Family: Erebidae
- Subfamily: Arctiinae
- Tribe: Arctiini
- Subtribe: Spilosomina
- Genus: Paracles
- Species: P. phaeocera

Binomial name
- Paracles phaeocera (Hampson, 1905)

Synonyms
- Antarctia phaeocera Hampson, 1905

Species of moth

Paracles phaeocera is a moth of the subfamily Arctiinae first described by George Hampson in 1905. It is found in Paraguay.
