= Paracles pallidivena =

Scientific classification
- Domain: Eukaryota
- Kingdom: Animalia
- Phylum: Arthropoda
- Class: Insecta
- Order: Lepidoptera
- Superfamily: Noctuoidea
- Family: Erebidae
- Subfamily: Arctiinae
- Genus: Paracles
- Species: P. pallidivena

Binomial name
- Paracles pallidivena (Schaus, 1904)

Synonyms
- Antarctia pallidivena Schaus, 1904

Species of moth

Paracles pallidivena is a moth of the subfamily Arctiinae first described by Schaus in 1904. It is found in Brazil.
