= Paracles lateralis =

Scientific classification
- Kingdom: Animalia
- Phylum: Arthropoda
- Class: Insecta
- Order: Lepidoptera
- Superfamily: Noctuoidea
- Family: Erebidae
- Subfamily: Arctiinae
- Tribe: Arctiini
- Subtribe: Spilosomina
- Genus: Paracles
- Species: P. lateralis

Binomial name
- Paracles lateralis (Walker, 1855)

Synonyms
- Motada lateralis Walker, 1855

Species of moth

Paracles lateralis is a moth of the subfamily Arctiinae first described by Francis Walker in 1855. It is found in Brazil.
