= Eurysthea magnifica =

Scientific classification
- Kingdom: Animalia
- Phylum: Arthropoda
- Class: Insecta
- Order: Coleoptera
- Suborder: Polyphaga
- Infraorder: Cucujiformia
- Family: Cerambycidae
- Genus: Eurysthea
- Species: E. magnifica

Binomial name
- Eurysthea magnifica Martins, 1985

Species of beetle

Eurysthea magnifica is a species of beetle in the family Cerambycidae. It was described by Martins in 1985.
