= Paracles surgens =

Scientific classification
- Kingdom: Animalia
- Phylum: Arthropoda
- Class: Insecta
- Order: Lepidoptera
- Superfamily: Noctuoidea
- Family: Erebidae
- Subfamily: Arctiinae
- Subtribe: Spilosomina
- Genus: Paracles
- Species: P. surgens

Binomial name
- Paracles surgens (Walker, 1865)

Synonyms
- Borseba surgens Walker, [1865]; Maenas surgens

Species of moth

Paracles surgens is a moth of the subfamily Arctiinae first described by Francis Walker in 1865. It is found in Colombia and Peru.
