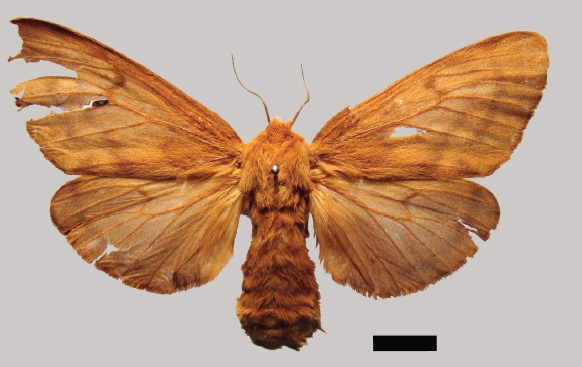

Scientific classification
- Domain: Eukaryota
- Kingdom: Animalia
- Phylum: Arthropoda
- Class: Insecta
- Order: Lepidoptera
- Superfamily: Noctuoidea
- Family: Erebidae
- Subfamily: Arctiinae
- Genus: Paracles
- Species: P. burmeisteri

Binomial name
- Paracles burmeisteri (Berg, 1877)

Synonyms
- Palustra burmeisteri Berg, 1877

= Paracles burmeisteri =

Species of moth

Paracles burmeisteri is a moth of the subfamily Arctiinae first described by Berg in 1877. It is found in Argentina.

The larvae feed on Potamogeton species.
