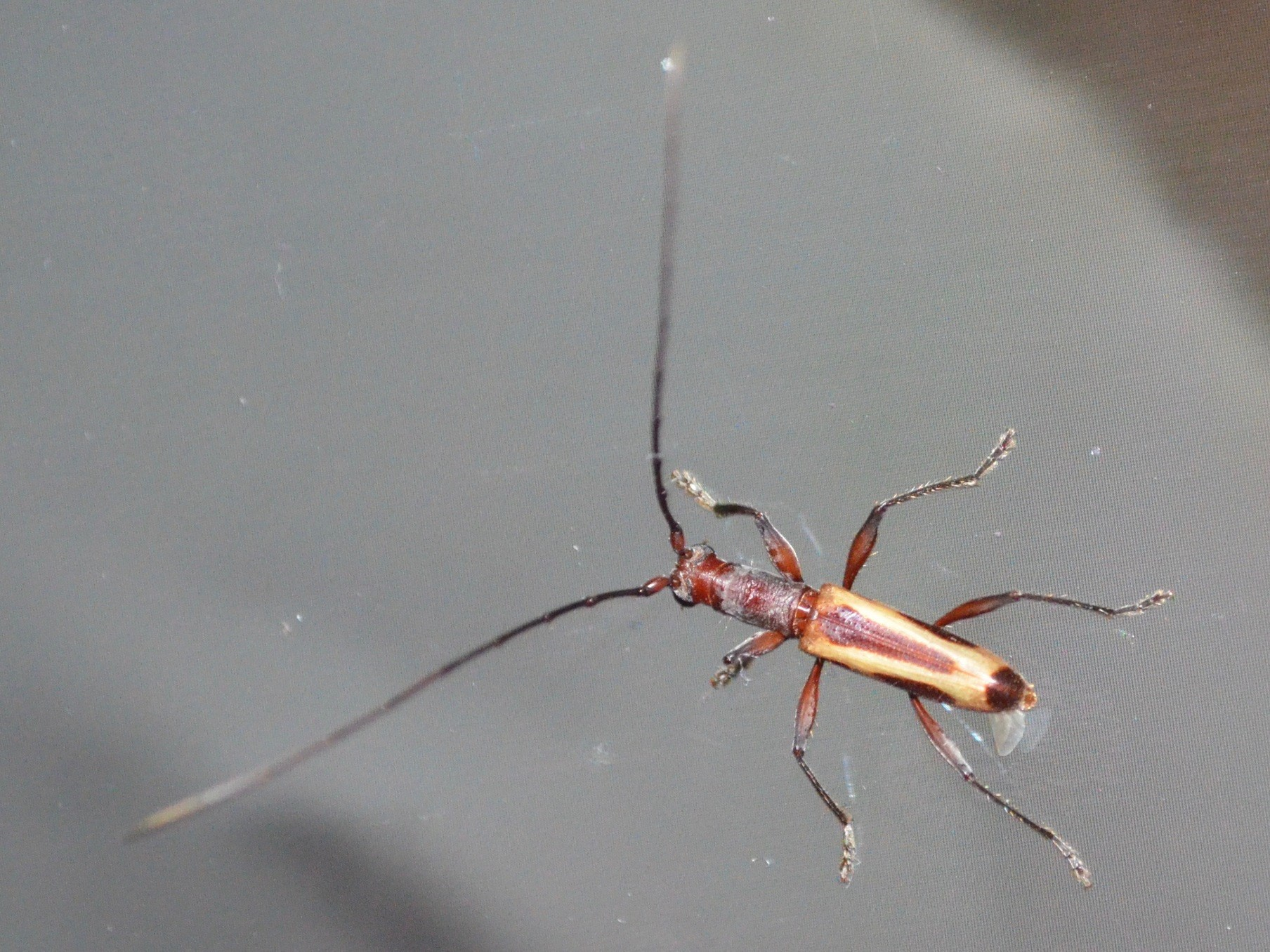

Scientific classification
- Domain: Eukaryota
- Kingdom: Animalia
- Phylum: Arthropoda
- Class: Insecta
- Order: Coleoptera
- Suborder: Polyphaga
- Infraorder: Cucujiformia
- Family: Cerambycidae
- Genus: Thoracibidion
- Species: T. buquetii

Binomial name
- Thoracibidion buquetii (Thomson, 1867)

= Thoracibidion buquetii =

Species of beetle

Thoracibidion buquetii is a species of beetle in the family Cerambycidae.
