= Paracles antennata =

Scientific classification
- Kingdom: Animalia
- Phylum: Arthropoda
- Class: Insecta
- Order: Lepidoptera
- Superfamily: Noctuoidea
- Family: Erebidae
- Subfamily: Arctiinae
- Genus: Paracles
- Species: P. antennata

Binomial name
- Paracles antennata (Walker, 1865)

Synonyms
- Laora antennata Walker, 1865

Species of moth

Paracles antennata is a moth of the subfamily Arctiinae first described by Francis Walker in 1865. It is found in Colombia.
