= Eurysthea lacordairei =

Scientific classification
- Kingdom: Animalia
- Phylum: Arthropoda
- Class: Insecta
- Order: Coleoptera
- Suborder: Polyphaga
- Infraorder: Cucujiformia
- Family: Cerambycidae
- Genus: Eurysthea
- Species: E. lacordairei

Binomial name
- Eurysthea lacordairei (Lacordaire, 1869)

Species of beetle

Eurysthea lacordairei is a species of beetles in the family Cerambycidae. It was described by Jean Lacordaire in 1869.
