= Eurysthea sordida =

Scientific classification
- Kingdom: Animalia
- Phylum: Arthropoda
- Class: Insecta
- Order: Coleoptera
- Suborder: Polyphaga
- Infraorder: Cucujiformia
- Family: Cerambycidae
- Genus: Eurysthea
- Species: E. sordida

Binomial name
- Eurysthea sordida (Erichson, 1847)

Species of beetle

Eurysthea sordida is a species of beetle in the family Cerambycidae. It was described by Wilhelm Ferdinand Erichson in 1847.
