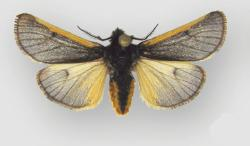
- Adult Andesobia jelskii

Scientific classification
- Kingdom: Animalia
- Phylum: Arthropoda
- Class: Insecta
- Order: Lepidoptera
- Superfamily: Noctuoidea
- Family: Erebidae
- Subfamily: Arctiinae
- Subtribe: Spilosomina
- Genus: Paracles; Walker, 1855

Synonyms
- Motada Walker, 1855; Laora Walker, 1855; Massicyta Walker, 1856; Borseba Walker, [1865]; Palustra Bar, 1873; Altimaenas Dyar, 1913; Pachylaelia Butler, 1878; Chilesia Ruiz-Rodriguez, 1989

= Paracles =

Genus of moths

Paracles is a genus of moths in the subfamily Arctiinae. The genus was described by Francis Walker in 1855. The species range from Panama to Patagonia, with quite a few in the southern temperate region of South America.

== Species ==
- Paracles affinis (Rothschild, 1910)
- Paracles albescens (Hampson, 1901)
- Paracles alonia (Schaus, 1933)
- Paracles amarga (Schaus, 1933)
- Paracles antennata (Walker, 1855)
- Paracles argentina (Berg, 1877)
- Paracles aurantiaca (Rothschild, 1910)
- Paracles azollae (Berg, 1877)
- Paracles bilinea (Schaus, 1901)
- Paracles bogotensis (Dognin, 1916)
- Paracles brittoni (Rothschild, 1910)
- Paracles brunnea (Hübner, [1831])
- Paracles burmeisteri (Berg, 1877)
- Paracles cajetani (Rothschild, 1910)
- Paracles cnethocampoides (Rothschild, 1910)
- Paracles contraria Walker, 1855
- Paracles costata (Burmeister, 1878)
- Paracles deserticola (Berg, 1875)
- Paracles discalis (Reich, 1933)
- Paracles dukinfieldia (Schaus, 1896)
- Paracles elongata (Rothschild, 1922)
- Paracles emerita (Schaus, 1933)
- Paracles felderi (Rothschild, 1910)
- Paracles fervida (Schaus, 1901)
- Paracles flavescens (Schaus, 1896)
- Paracles fosterana Watson & Goodger, 1986
- Paracles fosteri (Hampson, 1905)
- Paracles fulvicollis (Hampson, 1905)
- Paracles fusca (Walker, 1856)
- Paracles gigantea (E. D. Jones, 1908)
- Paracles haenschi (Rothschild, 1910)
- Paracles herbuloti (Toulgoët, 1975)
- Paracles honora (Schaus, 1896)
- Paracles insipida (Rothschild, 1910)
- Paracles juruana (Butler, 1878)
- Paracles klagesi (Rothschild, 1910)
- Paracles laboulbeni (Bar, 1873)
- Paracles laguerrei Toulgoët, 2000
- Paracles lateralis (Walker, 1855)
- Paracles lehmanni (Rothschild, 1910)
- Paracles magna (Rothschild, 1910)
- Paracles marcona (Schaus, 1933)
- Paracles nitida (E. D. Jones, 1908)
- Paracles obscurior (Schaus, 1933)
- Paracles ockendeni (Rothschild, 1910)
- Paracles pallidivena (Schaus, 1904)
- Paracles palmeri (Rothschild, 1910)
- Paracles palustris (Jörgensen, 1935)
- Paracles paula (Schaus, 1896)
- Paracles pectinalis E. D. Jones, 1908
- Paracles persimilis (Burmeister, 1878)
- Paracles peruensis (Dognin, 1907)
- Paracles peruviana (Rothschild, 1910)
- Paracles phaeocera (Hampson, 1905)
- Paracles plectoides (Maassen, 1890)
- Paracles postflavida (Rothschild, 1922)
- Paracles quadrata (Rothschild, 1910)
- Paracles reversa (E. D. Jones, 1908)
- Paracles rudis Butler, 1882
- Paracles sericea (Schaus, 1896)
- Paracles severa (Berg, 1875)
- Paracles steinbachi (Rothschild, 1910)
- Paracles surgens (Walker, [1865])
- Paracles tapina (Dyar, 1913)
- Paracles tenuis (Berg, 1877)
- Paracles thursbyi (Rothschild, 1910)
- Paracles tolimensis (Dognin, 1912)
- Paracles toulgoeti Watson & Goodger, 1986
- Paracles ubiana (Druce, 1898)
- Paracles uniformis (E. D. Jones, 1912)
- Paracles uruguayensis (Berg, 1886)
- Paracles valstana (Schaus, 1933)
- Paracles variegata (Schaus, 1896)
- Paracles venata (Schaus, 1894)
- Paracles vivida (Rothschild, 1910)
- Paracles vulpecula (Dognin, 1907)
- Paracles vulpina (Hübner, [1825])
