= Paracles juruana =

Scientific classification
- Domain: Eukaryota
- Kingdom: Animalia
- Phylum: Arthropoda
- Class: Insecta
- Order: Lepidoptera
- Superfamily: Noctuoidea
- Family: Erebidae
- Subfamily: Arctiinae
- Genus: Paracles
- Species: P. juruana

Binomial name
- Paracles juruana (Butler, 1878)

Synonyms
- Motada juruana Butler, 1878

Species of moth

Paracles juruana is a moth of the subfamily Arctiinae first described by Arthur Gardiner Butler in 1878. It is found in Amazon rainforest of Brazil.
