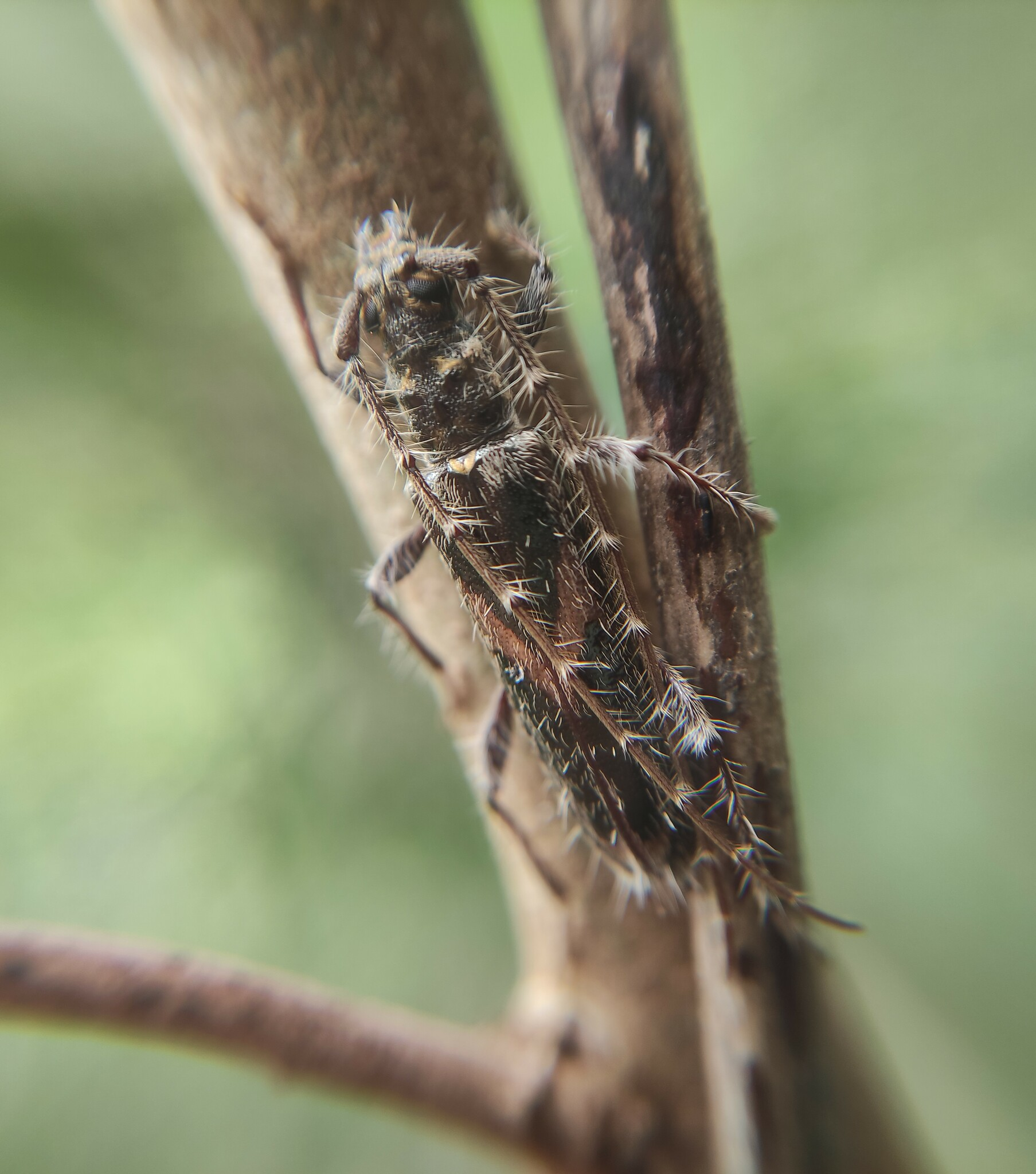

Scientific classification
- Kingdom: Animalia
- Phylum: Arthropoda
- Class: Insecta
- Order: Coleoptera
- Suborder: Polyphaga
- Infraorder: Cucujiformia
- Family: Cerambycidae
- Genus: Eurysthea
- Species: E. obliqua

Binomial name
- Eurysthea obliqua (Audinet-Serville, 1834)

= Eurysthea obliqua =

Species of beetle

Eurysthea obliqua is a species of beetle in the family Cerambycidae. It was described by Audinet-Serville in 1834.
