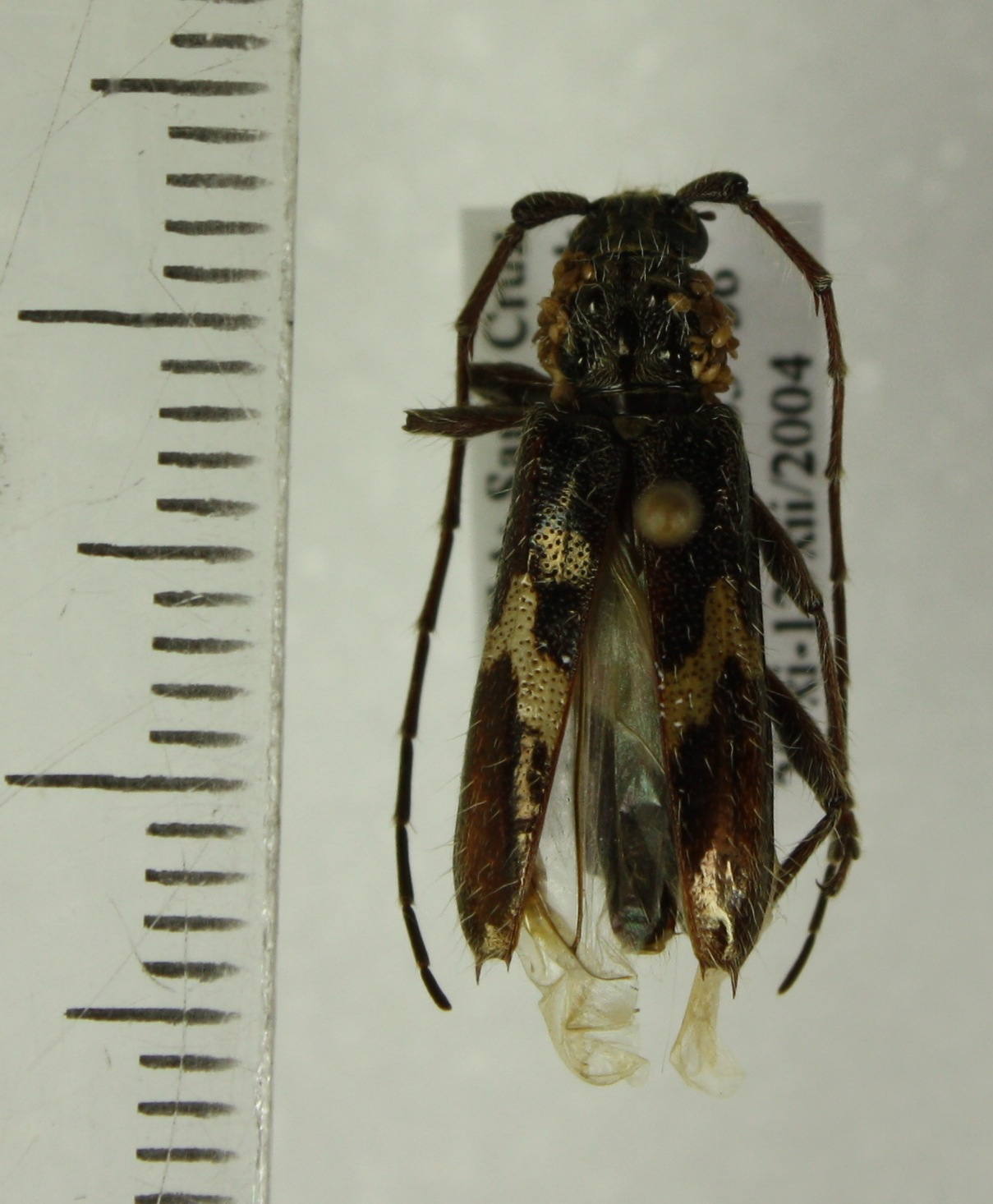

Scientific classification
- Kingdom: Animalia
- Phylum: Arthropoda
- Class: Insecta
- Order: Coleoptera
- Suborder: Polyphaga
- Infraorder: Cucujiformia
- Family: Cerambycidae
- Genus: Eurysthea
- Species: E. nicolai

Binomial name
- Eurysthea nicolai (Aurivillius, 1908)

= Eurysthea nicolai =

Species of beetle

Eurysthea nicolai is a species of beetle in the family Cerambycidae. It was described by Per Olof Christopher Aurivillius in 1908.
