= Paracles tapina =

Scientific classification
- Kingdom: Animalia
- Phylum: Arthropoda
- Class: Insecta
- Order: Lepidoptera
- Superfamily: Noctuoidea
- Family: Erebidae
- Subfamily: Arctiinae
- Genus: Paracles
- Species: P. tapina

Binomial name
- Paracles tapina (Dyar, 1913)

Synonyms
- Altimaenas tapina Dyar, 1913

Species of moth

Paracles tapina is a moth of the subfamily Arctiinae first described by Harrison Gray Dyar Jr. in 1913. It is found in Peru.
