= Sphaerion sladeni =

Scientific classification
- Kingdom: Animalia
- Phylum: Arthropoda
- Class: Insecta
- Order: Coleoptera
- Suborder: Polyphaga
- Infraorder: Cucujiformia
- Family: Cerambycidae
- Genus: Sphaerion
- Species: S. sladeni

Binomial name
- Sphaerion sladeni Gahan in Gahan & Arrow, 1903

Species of beetle

Sphaerion sladeni is a species of beetle in the family Cerambycidae. It was described by Gahan in 1903.
