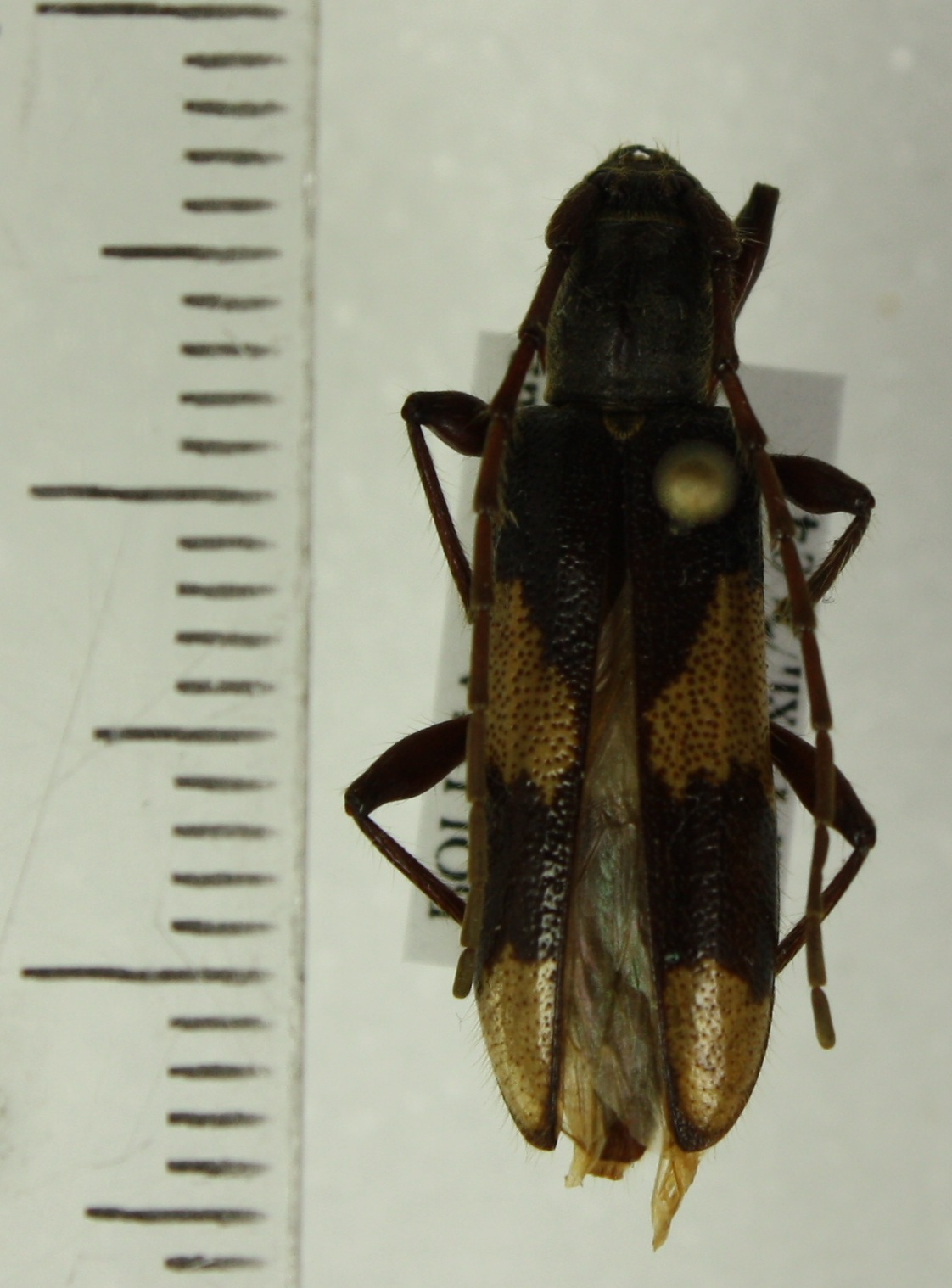

Scientific classification
- Kingdom: Animalia
- Phylum: Arthropoda
- Class: Insecta
- Order: Coleoptera
- Suborder: Polyphaga
- Infraorder: Cucujiformia
- Family: Cerambycidae
- Genus: Amorupi
- Species: A. hudepohli

Binomial name
- Amorupi hudepohli Martins, 1974

Synonyms
- Paramallocera hudepohli Martins, 1974

= Amorupi hudepohli =

Species of beetle

Amorupi hudepohli is a species of longhorn beetle in the Elaphidiini subfamily. It was described by Martins in 1974.
