= Sphaerion rusticum =

Scientific classification
- Kingdom: Animalia
- Phylum: Arthropoda
- Class: Insecta
- Order: Coleoptera
- Suborder: Polyphaga
- Infraorder: Cucujiformia
- Family: Cerambycidae
- Genus: Sphaerion
- Species: S. rusticum

Binomial name
- Sphaerion rusticum Burmeister, 1865

Species of beetle

Sphaerion rusticum is a species of beetle in the family Cerambycidae. It was described by Hermann Burmeister in 1865.
