= Paracles laguerrei =

Scientific classification
- Kingdom: Animalia
- Phylum: Arthropoda
- Class: Insecta
- Order: Lepidoptera
- Superfamily: Noctuoidea
- Family: Erebidae
- Subfamily: Arctiinae
- Tribe: Arctiini
- Subtribe: Spilosomina
- Genus: Paracles
- Species: P. laguerrei

Binomial name
- Paracles laguerrei de Toulget, 2000

Species of moth

Paracles laguerrei is a moth of the subfamily Arctiinae first described by Hervé de Toulgoët in 2000. It is found in Bolivia.
