= Paracles brittoni =

Scientific classification
- Domain: Eukaryota
- Kingdom: Animalia
- Phylum: Arthropoda
- Class: Insecta
- Order: Lepidoptera
- Superfamily: Noctuoidea
- Family: Erebidae
- Subfamily: Arctiinae
- Genus: Paracles
- Species: P. brittoni

Binomial name
- Paracles brittoni (Rothschild, 1910)

Synonyms
- Mallocephala brittoni Rothschild, 1910

Species of moth

Paracles brittoni is a moth of the subfamily Arctiinae first described by Rothschild in 1910. It is found in Argentina. The type specimen was collected at La Soledad, Entre Rios Province, by Ellen Alice Britton; the species was named in her honor.
