= Paracles ubiana =

Scientific classification
- Domain: Eukaryota
- Kingdom: Animalia
- Phylum: Arthropoda
- Class: Insecta
- Order: Lepidoptera
- Superfamily: Noctuoidea
- Family: Erebidae
- Subfamily: Arctiinae
- Genus: Paracles
- Species: P. ubiana

Binomial name
- Paracles ubiana (H. Druce, 1898)

Synonyms
- Antarctia ubiana H. Druce, 1898

Species of moth

Paracles ubiana is a moth of the subfamily Arctiinae first described by Herbert Druce in 1898. It is found in Panama.
