= Paracles cajetani =

Scientific classification
- Domain: Eukaryota
- Kingdom: Animalia
- Phylum: Arthropoda
- Class: Insecta
- Order: Lepidoptera
- Superfamily: Noctuoidea
- Family: Erebidae
- Subfamily: Arctiinae
- Genus: Paracles
- Species: P. cajetani

Binomial name
- Paracles cajetani (Rothschild, 1910)

Synonyms
- Antarctia cajetani Rothschild, 1910

Species of moth

Paracles cajetani is a moth of the subfamily Arctiinae first described by Rothschild in 1910. It is found in Uruguay.
