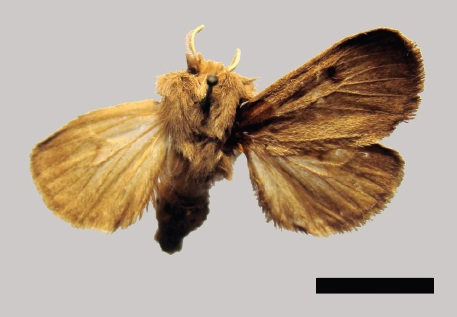

Scientific classification
- Kingdom: Animalia
- Phylum: Arthropoda
- Class: Insecta
- Order: Lepidoptera
- Superfamily: Noctuoidea
- Family: Erebidae
- Subfamily: Arctiinae
- Tribe: Arctiini
- Subtribe: Spilosomina
- Genus: Paracles
- Species: P. costata

Binomial name
- Paracles costata (Burmeister, 1878)

Synonyms
- Antarctia costata Burmeister, 1878; Paracles bergi Schaus, 1896

= Paracles costata =

Species of moth

Paracles costata is a moth of the subfamily Arctiinae first described by Hermann Burmeister in 1878. It is found in Brazil.
