= Ellen Alice Britton =

Insect collector and nursery gardener (1874–1959)

Ellen Alice Britton MBE
- Born: 17 September 1874; Marylebone
- Died: 6 September 1959 (aged 84); Tiverton, Devon
- Occupation(s): Insect collector Gardener
- Years active: 1899–1939

Ellen Alice Britton M.B.E. (17 September 1874 – 6 September 1959) was a British nursery gardener who was active as an insect collector in Argentina from circa 1899–1909, sometimes working with her brother Charles. Britton's specimens contributed to the first scientific description of several Lepidoptera species. Britton was awarded an M.B.E. in 1920 for her voluntary service during the First World War.

== Early life ==
Britton was born in Marylebone on 17 September 1874: her parents were William Samuel Britton, a surgeon, and Ellen Henson Britton (née Sharp), who had married in 1865.

Britton's father William had been married previously in 1842, a relationship that had endured a long estrangement and finally ended in divorce in 1863 after William's first wife Louisa Weekes Britton had a child with another man named Henry Burton. Because of her father's earlier marriage Ellen Britton had an older half-brother, as well as three full siblings from her father's second marriage with her mother Ellen Sharp. William Britton Snr. died in 1877 when Ellen Alice was three years old and afterwards she was cared for by her widowed mother Ellen in Berkhamstead, supported by her aunt and grandmother.

Ellen Alice Britton was educated at a girl's boarding school at 22 Denmark Terrace, Brighton, and was recorded as resident there aged 16 on the night of the 1891 England census.

== Natural history collecting in Argentina ==
Britton's older brother William Arthur Britton emigrated to Argentina to work as a sheep rancher, and was resident in the country by 1896 when he married Anna Dorothea Heuer (1870–1943) at Buenos Aires. Spending time with William Arthur and his family is a likely explanation for Ellen and Charles Britton visiting Argentina, where their collecting activity suggests they had arrived by 1899.

Insect specimens collected by the Britton siblings were all collected at Entre Rios Province: in 1899 one of the Brittons collected an example of the sphinx moth Manduca paphus paphus at La Soledad. An Arctiinae specimen collected by Ellen in January 1899, again at La Soledad, became the type specimen of a species described and named in her honour by Walter Rothschild, Paracles brittoni (Rothschild, 1910) – originally named Mallocephala brittoni.

In 1904–1905 Ellen collected several caddisfly specimens.

In April 1906, close to the Uruguayan border, Ellen collected the type specimen of the moth Erbessa dominula (Warren, 1909) which was described by William Warren at Tring, originally named Oricia dominula.

By 1906 Charles and Ellen had collected some examples of Argentinian butterflies for Lord Rothschild's Museum at Tring, including Parides bunichus sbsp. damocrates (Guenée, 1872), Heraclides thoas thoantiades (Burmeister, 1878), Heraclides anchisiades capys (Hubner, [1809]) and Papilio hellanichus Hewitson, 1868.

In 1909 at La Soledad near the Uruguayan border Ellen captured and then bred a series of a Geometrid moth which was later described and named Iridopsis brittonae in her honour by Louis Beethoven Prout.

== Return to the U.K. and volunteering during World War I ==
In 1910 Ellen Britton was recorded as travelling back to the UK from Buenos Aires aboard the ship Asturias.

In around 1913 Britton and her older sister Marion moved to Tiverton, Devon where they lived in a house called Beecroft, opening their garden to the public regularly for fundraising towards good causes. During the First World War Ellen worked as quartermaster for the Red Cross Voluntary Aid Detachment hospital that was based at Knightshayes Court, a service for which she was awarded a civilian M.B.E. in 1920.

Ellen Britton contributed living plants, bulbs and seeds to Kew Gardens in 1935. She was still working as a nursery gardener in 1939.

== Death and legacy ==
Ellen Britton died at Tiverton on 6 September 1959.

Specimens collected by Britton formed part of Lord Walter Rothchild's bequest of his collections to the British Museum, and are now part of the collection of the Natural History Museum, London.
