= Paracles emerita =

Scientific classification
- Domain: Eukaryota
- Kingdom: Animalia
- Phylum: Arthropoda
- Class: Insecta
- Order: Lepidoptera
- Superfamily: Noctuoidea
- Family: Erebidae
- Subfamily: Arctiinae
- Genus: Paracles
- Species: P. emerita

Binomial name
- Paracles emerita (Schaus, 1933)

Synonyms
- Antarctia emerita Schaus, 1933

Species of moth

Paracles emerita is a moth of the subfamily Arctiinae first described by Schaus in 1833. It is found in Paraguay.
