= Chlanidophora albicancellata =

Scientific classification
- Kingdom: Animalia
- Phylum: Arthropoda
- Class: Insecta
- Order: Lepidoptera
- Superfamily: Noctuoidea
- Family: Noctuidae
- Genus: Chlanidophora
- Species: C. albicancellata

Binomial name
- Chlanidophora albicancellata (Burmeister, 1878)

Synonyms
- Caridarctia albicancellata

Species of moth

Chlanidophora albicancellata is a moth in the family Noctuidae first described by Hermann Burmeister in 1878. It can be found in Argentina; it was historically misclassified, but in 2010 was determined to belong to the subfamily Agaristinae.
