= Paracles amarga =

Scientific classification
- Domain: Eukaryota
- Kingdom: Animalia
- Phylum: Arthropoda
- Class: Insecta
- Order: Lepidoptera
- Superfamily: Noctuoidea
- Family: Erebidae
- Subfamily: Arctiinae
- Genus: Paracles
- Species: P. amarga

Binomial name
- Paracles amarga (Schaus, 1933)

Synonyms
- Antarctia amarga Schaus, 1933

Species of moth

Paracles amarga is a moth of the subfamily Arctiinae first described by Schaus in 1933. It is found in Argentina.
