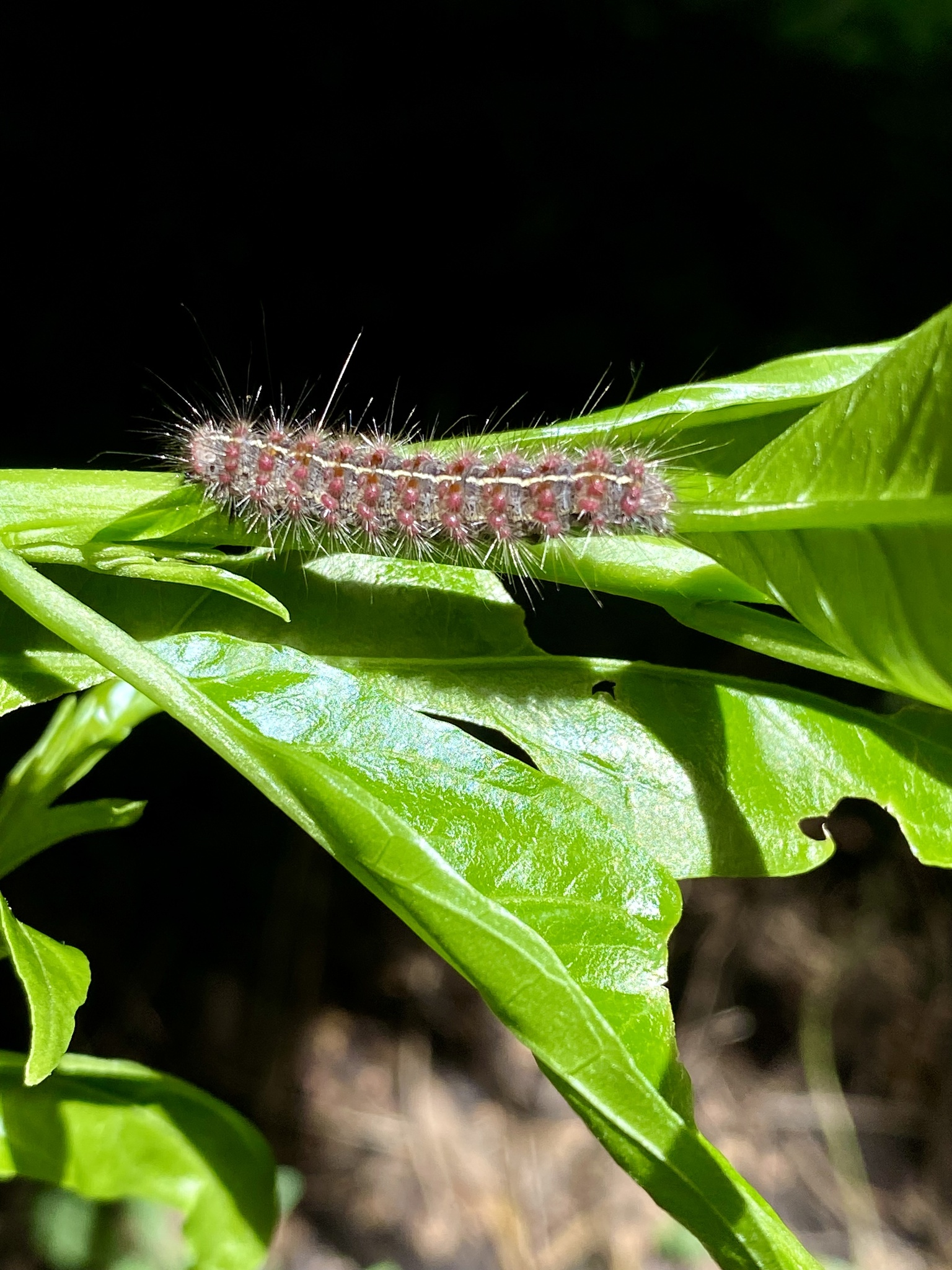
- Paracles fusca caterpillar, Argentina
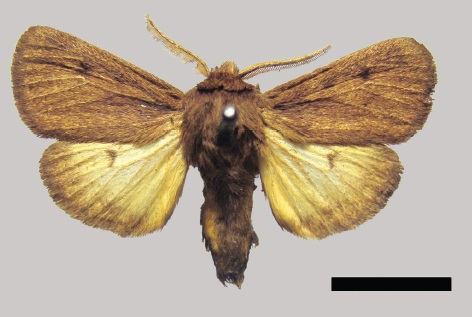

Scientific classification
- Kingdom: Animalia
- Phylum: Arthropoda
- Class: Insecta
- Order: Lepidoptera
- Superfamily: Noctuoidea
- Family: Erebidae
- Subfamily: Arctiinae
- Tribe: Arctiini
- Subtribe: Spilosomina
- Genus: Paracles
- Species: P. fusca

Binomial name
- Paracles fusca (Walker, 1856)

Synonyms
- Massicyta fusca Walker, 1856; Antarctia multifarior Burmeister, 1878

= Paracles fusca =

Species of moth

Paracles fusca is a moth of the subfamily Arctiinae first described by Francis Walker in 1856. It is found in Brazil and Argentina.
