= Paracles bilinea =

Scientific classification
- Domain: Eukaryota
- Kingdom: Animalia
- Phylum: Arthropoda
- Class: Insecta
- Order: Lepidoptera
- Superfamily: Noctuoidea
- Family: Erebidae
- Subfamily: Arctiinae
- Genus: Paracles
- Species: P. bilinea

Binomial name
- Paracles bilinea (Schaus, 1901)

Synonyms
- Maenas bilinea Schaus, 1901

Species of moth

Paracles bilinea is a moth of the subfamily Arctiinae first described by Schaus in 1901. It is found in Brazil.
