= Paracles fulvicollis =

Scientific classification
- Kingdom: Animalia
- Phylum: Arthropoda
- Class: Insecta
- Order: Lepidoptera
- Superfamily: Noctuoidea
- Family: Erebidae
- Subfamily: Arctiinae
- Tribe: Arctiini
- Subtribe: Spilosomina
- Genus: Paracles
- Species: P. fulvicollis

Binomial name
- Paracles fulvicollis (Hampson, 1905)

Synonyms
- Antarctia fulvicollis Hampson, 1905

Species of moth

Paracles fulvicollis is a moth of the subfamily Arctiinae first described by George Hampson in 1905. It is found in Chile. There are several species in the southern temperate region of South America, from Panama to Patagonia.
