= Paracles honora =

Scientific classification
- Domain: Eukaryota
- Kingdom: Animalia
- Phylum: Arthropoda
- Class: Insecta
- Order: Lepidoptera
- Superfamily: Noctuoidea
- Family: Erebidae
- Subfamily: Arctiinae
- Genus: Paracles
- Species: P. honora

Binomial name
- Paracles honora (Schaus, 1896)

Synonyms
- Motada honora Schaus, 1896

Species of moth

Paracles honora is a moth of the subfamily Arctiinae first described by Schaus in 1896. It is found in Colombia and Brazil.
