= Paracles brunnea =

Scientific classification
- Kingdom: Animalia
- Phylum: Arthropoda
- Clade: Pancrustacea
- Class: Insecta
- Order: Lepidoptera
- Superfamily: Noctuoidea
- Family: Erebidae
- Subfamily: Arctiinae
- Genus: Paracles
- Species: P. brunnea

Binomial name
- Paracles brunnea (Hübner, 1831)

Synonyms
- Antarctia brunnea Hubner, 1831

Species of moth

Paracles brunnea is a moth of the subfamily Arctiinae first described by Jacob Hübner in 1831. It is found in Brazil, Argentina and Patagonia.
