= Thoracibidion =

Scientific classification
- Domain: Eukaryota
- Kingdom: Animalia
- Phylum: Arthropoda
- Class: Insecta
- Order: Coleoptera
- Suborder: Polyphaga
- Infraorder: Cucujiformia
- Family: Cerambycidae
- Subfamily: Cerambycinae
- Tribe: Ibidionini
- Genus: Thoracibidion; Martins, 1960

Genus of beetles

Thoracibidion is a genus of beetles in the family Cerambycidae, containing the following species:

- Thoracibidion buquetii (Thomson, 1867)
- Thoracibidion fasciiferum (Berg, 1889)
- Thoracibidion flavopictum (Perty, 1832)
- Thoracibidion franzae Martins, 1968
- Thoracibidion galbum Martins, 1968
- Thoracibidion insigne Martins, 1968
- Thoracibidion io (Thomson, 1867)
- Thoracibidion lineatocolle (Thomson, 1865)
- Thoracibidion pleurostictum (Bates, 1885)
- Thoracibidion ruficaudatum (Thomson, 1865)
- Thoracibidion striatocolle (White, 1855)
- Thoracibidion terminatum Martins, 1968
- Thoracibidion tomentosum Martins, 1960
