= Sphaerion exutum =

Scientific classification
- Kingdom: Animalia
- Phylum: Arthropoda
- Class: Insecta
- Order: Coleoptera
- Suborder: Polyphaga
- Infraorder: Cucujiformia
- Family: Cerambycidae
- Genus: Sphaerion
- Species: S. exutum

Binomial name
- Sphaerion exutum (Newman, 1841)

Species of beetle

Sphaerion exutum is a species of beetle in the family Cerambycidae. It was described by Newman in 1841.

The species belongs to the genus Sphaerion, which was established by Audinet-Serville in 1834. Members of this genus are part of the tribe Elaphidiini within the subfamily Cerambycinae. Sphaerion exutum is recorded from regions in the Americas, including Mexico and parts of South America.
