= Paracles peruviana =

Scientific classification
- Kingdom: Animalia
- Phylum: Arthropoda
- Clade: Pancrustacea
- Class: Insecta
- Order: Lepidoptera
- Superfamily: Noctuoidea
- Family: Erebidae
- Subfamily: Arctiinae
- Tribe: Arctiini
- Subtribe: Spilosomina
- Genus: Paracles
- Species: P. peruviana

Binomial name
- Paracles peruviana (Rothschild, 1910)

Synonyms
- Antarctia peruviana Rothschild, 1910

Species of moth

Paracles peruviana is a moth of the subfamily Arctiinae first described by Rothschild in 1910. It is found in Peru.Paracles peruviana belongs to the genus Paracles, and the family Arctiidae.
