= Paracles gigantea =

Scientific classification
- Domain: Eukaryota
- Kingdom: Animalia
- Phylum: Arthropoda
- Class: Insecta
- Order: Lepidoptera
- Superfamily: Noctuoidea
- Family: Erebidae
- Subfamily: Arctiinae
- Genus: Paracles
- Species: P. gigantea

Binomial name
- Paracles gigantea (E. D. Jones, 1908)

Synonyms
- Antarctia gigantea E. D. Jones, 1908

Species of moth

Paracles gigantea is a moth of the subfamily Arctiinae first described by E. Dukinfield Jones in 1908. It is found in Brazil.
