= Thoracibidion tomentosum =

Scientific classification
- Domain: Eukaryota
- Kingdom: Animalia
- Phylum: Arthropoda
- Class: Insecta
- Order: Coleoptera
- Suborder: Polyphaga
- Infraorder: Cucujiformia
- Family: Cerambycidae
- Genus: Thoracibidion
- Species: T. tomentosum

Binomial name
- Thoracibidion tomentosum Martins, 1960

Species of beetle

Thoracibidion tomentosum is a species of beetle in the family Cerambycidae. It was described by Martins in 1960.
