= Paracles alonia =

Scientific classification
- Domain: Eukaryota
- Kingdom: Animalia
- Phylum: Arthropoda
- Class: Insecta
- Order: Lepidoptera
- Superfamily: Noctuoidea
- Family: Erebidae
- Subfamily: Arctiinae
- Genus: Paracles
- Species: P. alonia

Binomial name
- Paracles alonia (Schaus, 1933)

Synonyms
- Maenas alonia Schaus, 1933

Species of moth

Paracles alonia is a moth of the subfamily Arctiinae first described by Schaus in 1933. It is found in Brazil.
