= Paracles uniformis =

Scientific classification
- Domain: Eukaryota
- Kingdom: Animalia
- Phylum: Arthropoda
- Class: Insecta
- Order: Lepidoptera
- Superfamily: Noctuoidea
- Family: Erebidae
- Subfamily: Arctiinae
- Genus: Paracles
- Species: P. uniformis

Binomial name
- Paracles uniformis (E. D. Jones, 1912)

Synonyms
- Antarctia uniformis E. D. Jones, 1912

Species of moth

Paracles uniformis is a moth of the subfamily Arctiinae first described by E. Dukinfield Jones in 1912. It is found in Brazil.
