= Paracles palustris =

Scientific classification
- Domain: Eukaryota
- Kingdom: Animalia
- Phylum: Arthropoda
- Class: Insecta
- Order: Lepidoptera
- Superfamily: Noctuoidea
- Family: Erebidae
- Subfamily: Arctiinae
- Genus: Paracles
- Species: P. palustris

Binomial name
- Paracles palustris (Jörgensen, 1935)

Synonyms
- Antarctia palustris Jorgensen, 1935

Species of moth

Paracles palustris is a moth of the subfamily Arctiinae first described by Peter Jörgensen in 1935. It is found in Paraguay.
