= Paracles plectoides =

Scientific classification
- Domain: Eukaryota
- Kingdom: Animalia
- Phylum: Arthropoda
- Class: Insecta
- Order: Lepidoptera
- Superfamily: Noctuoidea
- Family: Erebidae
- Subfamily: Arctiinae
- Genus: Paracles
- Species: P. plectoides

Binomial name
- Paracles plectoides (Maassen, 1890)

Synonyms
- Purius plectoides Maassen, 1890; Elysius plectoides (Maassen, 1890)

Species of moth

Paracles plectoides is a moth of the subfamily Arctiinae first described by Peter Maassen in 1890. It is found in Colombia.
