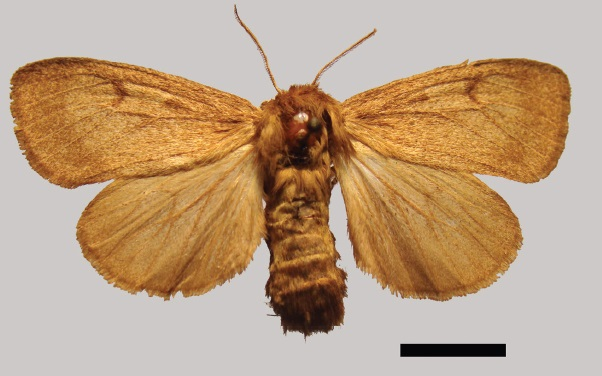

Scientific classification
- Kingdom: Animalia
- Phylum: Arthropoda
- Class: Insecta
- Order: Lepidoptera
- Superfamily: Noctuoidea
- Family: Erebidae
- Subfamily: Arctiinae
- Genus: Paracles
- Species: P. persimilis

Binomial name
- Paracles persimilis (Burmeister, 1878)

Synonyms
- Antarctia persimilis Burmeister, 1878

= Paracles persimilis =

Species of moth

Paracles persimilis is a moth of the subfamily Arctiinae first described by Hermann Burmeister in 1878. It is found in Brazil.
