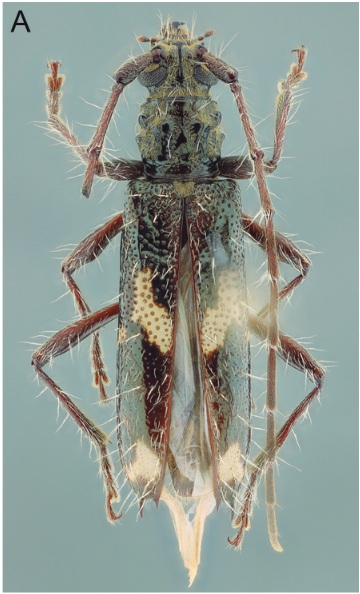

Scientific classification
- Kingdom: Animalia
- Phylum: Arthropoda
- Clade: Pancrustacea
- Class: Insecta
- Order: Coleoptera
- Suborder: Polyphaga
- Infraorder: Cucujiformia
- Family: Cerambycidae
- Genus: Eurysthea
- Species: E. hirta

Binomial name
- Eurysthea hirta (Kirby, 1818)

Synonyms
- Stenocorus hirtus Kirby, 1818; Mallocera vau Berg, 1889; Mallocera oblita Lameere, 1890

= Eurysthea hirta =

Species of beetle

Eurysthea hirta is a species of beetle in the family Cerambycidae. It was described by William Kirby in 1818. It is found in Brazil, Paraguay, Argentina and Uruguay.
