= Eurysthea rotundicollis =

Scientific classification
- Kingdom: Animalia
- Phylum: Arthropoda
- Class: Insecta
- Order: Coleoptera
- Suborder: Polyphaga
- Infraorder: Cucujiformia
- Family: Cerambycidae
- Genus: Eurysthea
- Species: E. rotundicollis

Binomial name
- Eurysthea rotundicollis (Martins, 1995)

Species of beetle

Eurysthea rotundicollis is a species of beetle in the family Cerambycidae. It was described by Martins in 1995.
