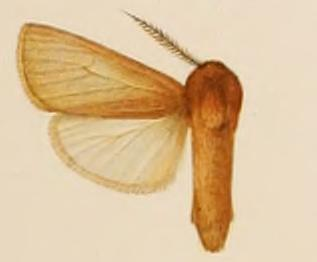
- Male
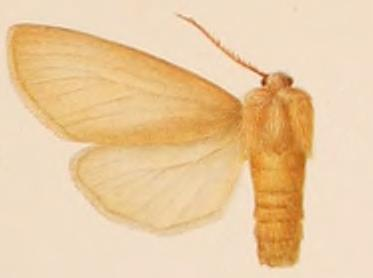
- Female

Scientific classification
- Domain: Eukaryota
- Kingdom: Animalia
- Phylum: Arthropoda
- Class: Insecta
- Order: Lepidoptera
- Superfamily: Noctuoidea
- Family: Erebidae
- Subfamily: Arctiinae
- Genus: Paracles
- Species: P. fosterana

Binomial name
- Paracles fosterana Watson & Goodger, 1986

Synonyms
- Antarctia fosteri Rothschild, 1910 (Preocc.)

= Paracles fosterana =

Species of moth

Paracles fosterana is a moth of the subfamily Arctiinae first described by Watson and Goodger in 1986. It is found in Paraguay.
