= Thoracibidion striatocolle =

Scientific classification
- Domain: Eukaryota
- Kingdom: Animalia
- Phylum: Arthropoda
- Class: Insecta
- Order: Coleoptera
- Suborder: Polyphaga
- Infraorder: Cucujiformia
- Family: Cerambycidae
- Genus: Thoracibidion
- Species: T. striatocolle

Binomial name
- Thoracibidion striatocolle (White, 1855)

Species of beetle

Thoracibidion striatocolle is a species of beetle in the family Cerambycidae. It was described by White in 1855.
