= Paracles paula =

Scientific classification
- Domain: Eukaryota
- Kingdom: Animalia
- Phylum: Arthropoda
- Class: Insecta
- Order: Lepidoptera
- Superfamily: Noctuoidea
- Family: Erebidae
- Subfamily: Arctiinae
- Genus: Paracles
- Species: P. paula

Binomial name
- Paracles paula (Schaus, 1896)

Synonyms
- Motada paula Schaus, 1896

Species of moth

Paracles paula is a moth of the subfamily Arctiinae first described by Schaus in 1896. It is found in Brazil.
