= Sphaerion =

Scientific classification
- Kingdom: Animalia
- Phylum: Arthropoda
- Class: Insecta
- Order: Coleoptera
- Suborder: Polyphaga
- Infraorder: Cucujiformia
- Family: Cerambycidae
- Subfamily: Cerambycinae
- Tribe: Elaphidiini
- Genus: Sphaerion; Audinet-Serville, 1834

Genus of beetles

Sphaerion is a genus of beetles in the family Cerambycidae, containing the following species:

- Sphaerion cyanipenne Audinet-Serville, 1834
- Sphaerion exutum (Newman, 1841)
- Sphaerion inerme White, 1853
- Sphaerion lentiginosum Berg, 1889
- Sphaerion rusticum Burmeister, 1865
- Sphaerion sladeni Gahan in Gahan & Arrow, 1903
