= Eurysthea koepckei =

Scientific classification
- Kingdom: Animalia
- Phylum: Arthropoda
- Class: Insecta
- Order: Coleoptera
- Suborder: Polyphaga
- Infraorder: Cucujiformia
- Family: Cerambycidae
- Genus: Eurysthea
- Species: E. koepckei

Binomial name
- Eurysthea koepckei (Franz, 1956)

Species of beetle

Eurysthea koepckei is a species of beetle in the family Cerambycidae. It was described by Franz in 1956.
