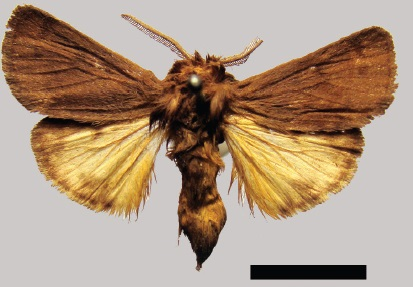

Scientific classification
- Domain: Eukaryota
- Kingdom: Animalia
- Phylum: Arthropoda
- Class: Insecta
- Order: Lepidoptera
- Superfamily: Noctuoidea
- Family: Erebidae
- Subfamily: Arctiinae
- Genus: Paracles
- Species: P. azollae

Binomial name
- Paracles azollae (Berg, 1877)

Synonyms
- Palustra azollae Berg, 1877

= Paracles azollae =

Species of moth

Paracles azollae is a moth of the subfamily Arctiinae first described by Berg in 1877. It is found in Argentina.
