= Paracles herbuloti =

Scientific classification
- Kingdom: Animalia
- Phylum: Arthropoda
- Class: Insecta
- Order: Lepidoptera
- Superfamily: Noctuoidea
- Family: Erebidae
- Subfamily: Arctiinae
- Tribe: Arctiini
- Subtribe: Spilosomina
- Genus: Paracles
- Species: P. herbuloti

Binomial name
- Paracles herbuloti (Toulgoët, 1975)

Synonyms
- Antarctia herbuloti Toulgoët, 1975; Altimaenas herbuloti (Toulgoët, 1975)

Species of moth

Paracles herbuloti is a moth of the subfamily Arctiinae first described by Hervé de Toulgoët in 1975. It is found in Ecuador.
