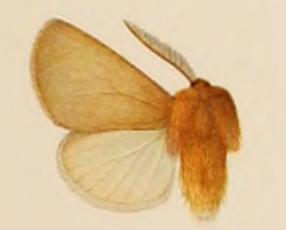
- Male
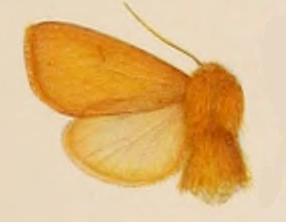
- Female

Scientific classification
- Domain: Eukaryota
- Kingdom: Animalia
- Phylum: Arthropoda
- Class: Insecta
- Order: Lepidoptera
- Superfamily: Noctuoidea
- Family: Erebidae
- Subfamily: Arctiinae
- Genus: Paracles
- Species: P. aurantiaca

Binomial name
- Paracles aurantiaca (Rothschild, 1910)

Synonyms
- Antarctia aurantiaca Rothschild, 1910

= Paracles aurantiaca =

Species of moth

Paracles aurantiaca is a moth of the subfamily Arctiinae first described by Rothschild in 1910. It is found in Bolivia, Brazil and Paraguay.
