= Eurysthea caesariata =

Scientific classification
- Kingdom: Animalia
- Phylum: Arthropoda
- Class: Insecta
- Order: Coleoptera
- Suborder: Polyphaga
- Infraorder: Cucujiformia
- Family: Cerambycidae
- Genus: Eurysthea
- Species: E. caesariata

Binomial name
- Eurysthea caesariata (Martins, 1995)

Species of beetle

Eurysthea caesariata is a species of beetle in the family Cerambycidae. It was described by Martins in 1995.
