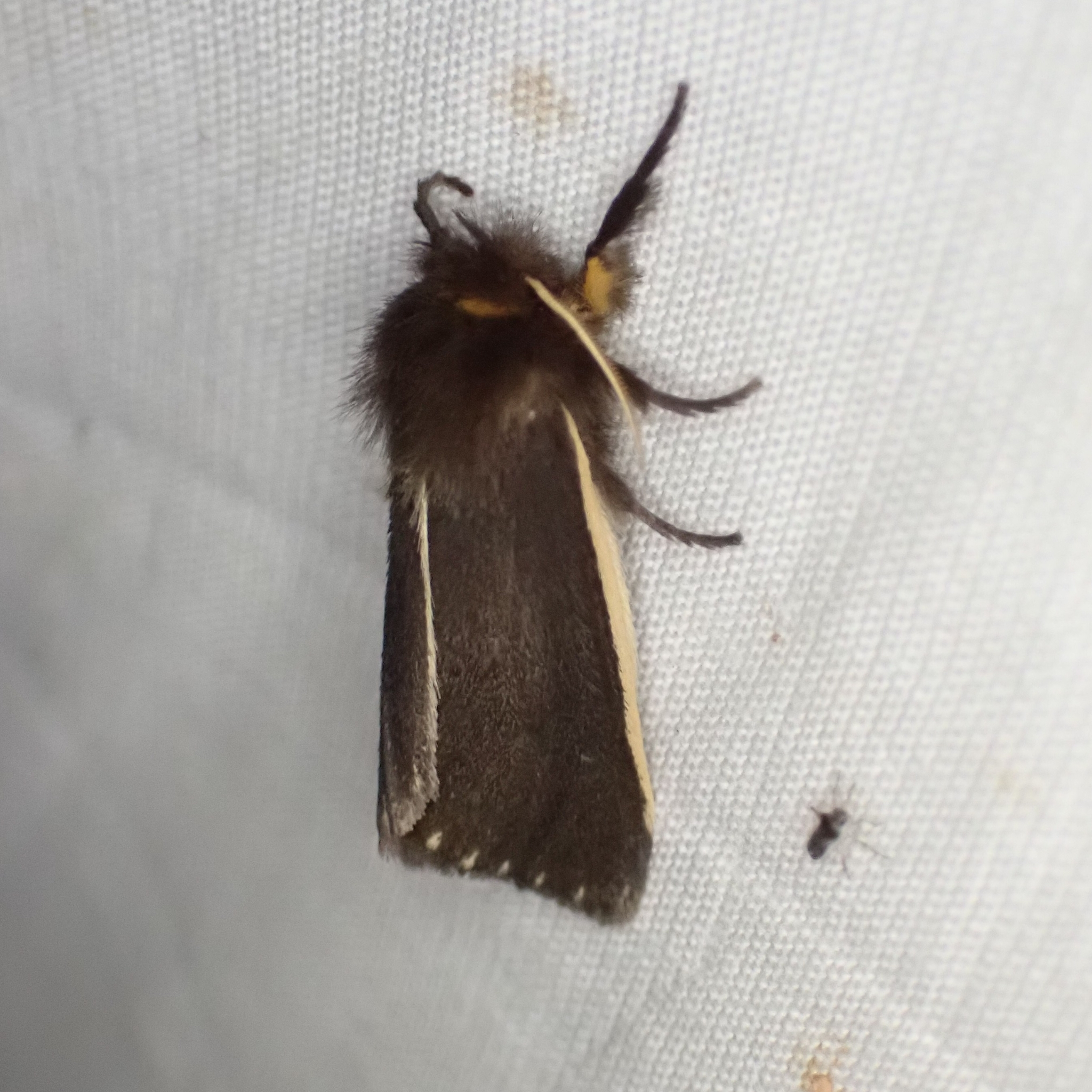
- Paracles contraria, Bolivia

Scientific classification
- Kingdom: Animalia
- Phylum: Arthropoda
- Class: Insecta
- Order: Lepidoptera
- Superfamily: Noctuoidea
- Family: Erebidae
- Subfamily: Arctiinae
- Tribe: Arctiini
- Subtribe: Spilosomina
- Genus: Paracles
- Species: P. contraria

Binomial name
- Paracles contraria Walker, 1855

= Paracles contraria =

Species of moth

Paracles contraria is a moth of the subfamily Arctiinae first described by Francis Walker in 1855. It is found in the Amazon rainforest of Brazil, French Guiana and Bolivia.
