= Paracles venata =

Scientific classification
- Domain: Eukaryota
- Kingdom: Animalia
- Phylum: Arthropoda
- Class: Insecta
- Order: Lepidoptera
- Superfamily: Noctuoidea
- Family: Erebidae
- Subfamily: Arctiinae
- Genus: Paracles
- Species: P. venata

Binomial name
- Paracles venata (Schaus, 1894)

Synonyms
- Antarctia venata Schaus, 1894

Species of moth

Paracles venata is a moth of the subfamily Arctiinae first described by Schaus in 1894. It is found in Brazil.
