= Paracles bogotensis =

Scientific classification
- Domain: Eukaryota
- Kingdom: Animalia
- Phylum: Arthropoda
- Class: Insecta
- Order: Lepidoptera
- Superfamily: Noctuoidea
- Family: Erebidae
- Subfamily: Arctiinae
- Genus: Paracles
- Species: P. bogotensis

Binomial name
- Paracles bogotensis (Dognin, 1916)

Synonyms
- Mallocephala bogotensis Dognin, 1916

Species of moth

Paracles bogotensis is a moth of the subfamily Arctiinae first described by Paul Dognin in 1916. It is found in Colombia.
