= Thoracibidion lineatocolle =

Scientific classification
- Kingdom: Animalia
- Phylum: Arthropoda
- Clade: Pancrustacea
- Class: Insecta
- Order: Coleoptera
- Suborder: Polyphaga
- Infraorder: Cucujiformia
- Family: Cerambycidae
- Genus: Thoracibidion
- Species: T. lineatocolle

Binomial name
- Thoracibidion lineatocolle (Thomson, 1865)

Species of beetle

Thoracibidion lineatocolle is a species of beetle in the family Cerambycidae. It was described by Thomson in 1865. It is found in Brazil (Bahia, Minas Gerais, Espírito Santo, Rio de Janeiro, São Paulo, Paraná).
