= Paracles vulpecula =

Scientific classification
- Domain: Eukaryota
- Kingdom: Animalia
- Phylum: Arthropoda
- Class: Insecta
- Order: Lepidoptera
- Superfamily: Noctuoidea
- Family: Erebidae
- Subfamily: Arctiinae
- Genus: Paracles
- Species: P. vulpecula

Binomial name
- Paracles vulpecula (Dognin, 1907)

Synonyms
- Antarctia vulpecula Dognin, 1907

Species of moth

Paracles vulpecula is a moth of the subfamily Arctiinae first described by Paul Dognin in 1907. It is found in Peru.
