= Paracles pectinalis =

Scientific classification
- Domain: Eukaryota
- Kingdom: Animalia
- Phylum: Arthropoda
- Class: Insecta
- Order: Lepidoptera
- Superfamily: Noctuoidea
- Family: Erebidae
- Subfamily: Arctiinae
- Genus: Paracles
- Species: P. pectinalis

Binomial name
- Paracles pectinalis E. D. Jones, 1908

Species of moth

Paracles pectinalis is a moth of the subfamily Arctiinae first described by E. Dukinfield Jones in 1908. It is found in Brazil.
