= Paracles sericea =

Scientific classification
- Domain: Eukaryota
- Kingdom: Animalia
- Phylum: Arthropoda
- Class: Insecta
- Order: Lepidoptera
- Superfamily: Noctuoidea
- Family: Erebidae
- Subfamily: Arctiinae
- Genus: Paracles
- Species: P. sericea

Binomial name
- Paracles sericea (Schaus, 1896)

Synonyms
- Palustra sericea Schaus, 1896; Antarctia brunneivenis Strand, 1919; Antarctia romani Bryk, 1953

Species of moth

Paracles sericea is a moth of the subfamily Arctiinae first described by William Schaus in 1896. It is found in Brazil.

== Subspecies ==
- Paracles sericea sericea (Brazil)
- Paracles sericea romani (Bryk, 1953) (Brazil)
