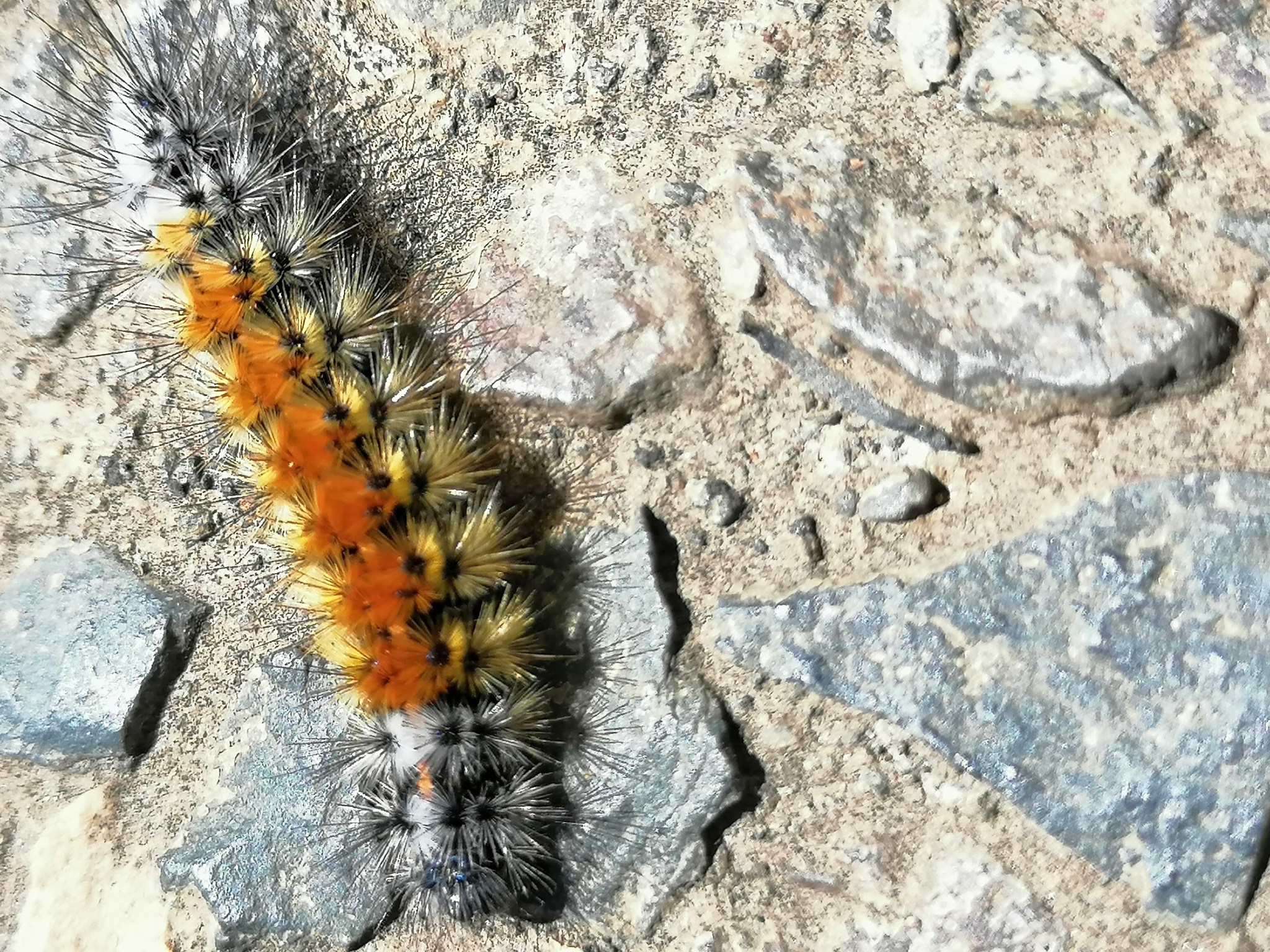
- Larva
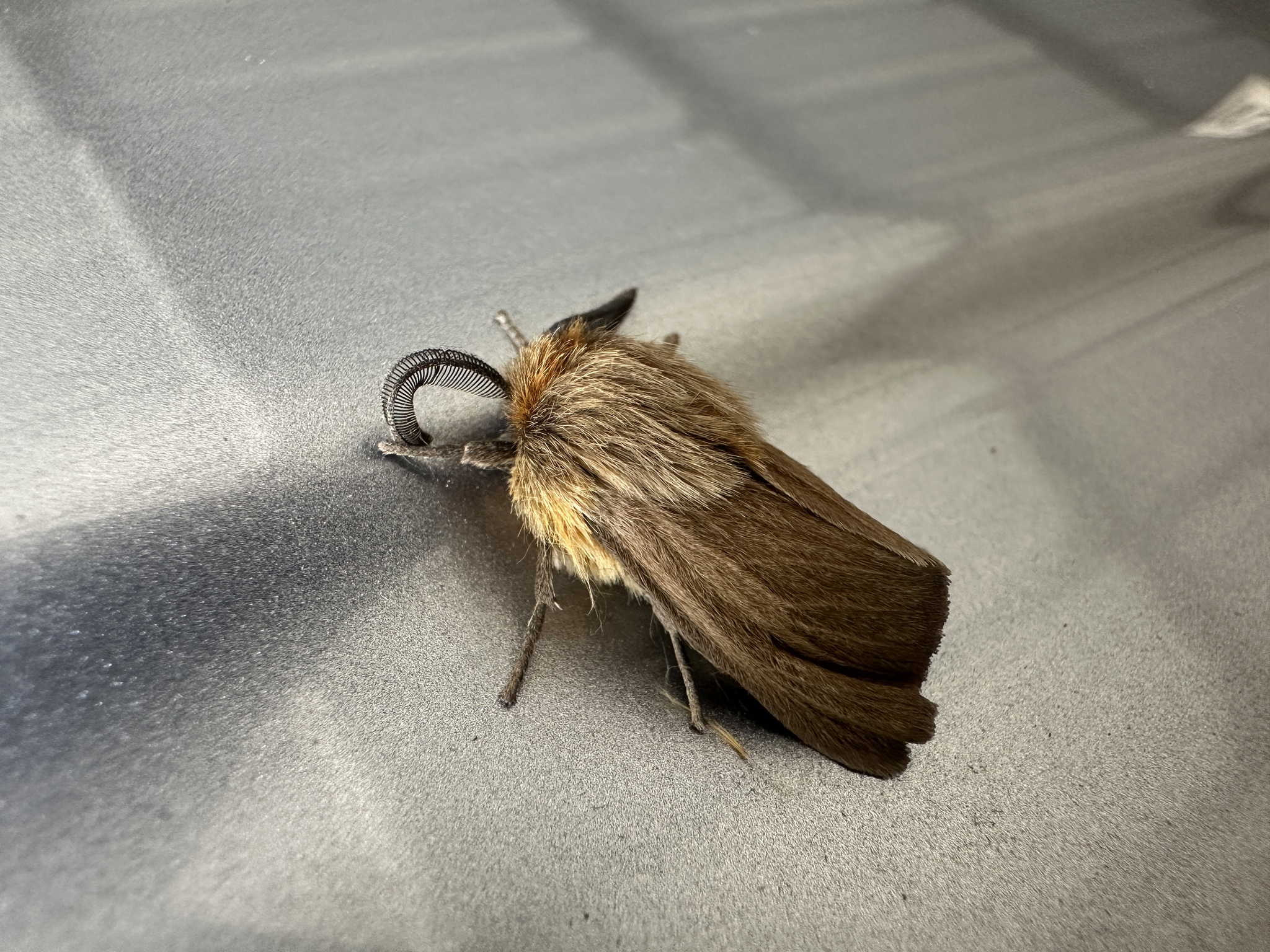
- Adult

Scientific classification
- Kingdom: Animalia
- Phylum: Arthropoda
- Clade: Pancrustacea
- Class: Insecta
- Order: Lepidoptera
- Superfamily: Noctuoidea
- Family: Erebidae
- Subfamily: Arctiinae
- Tribe: Arctiini
- Subtribe: Spilosomina
- Genus: Paracles
- Species: P. rudis

Binomial name
- Paracles rudis (Butler, 1882)

Synonyms
- Antarctia rudis Butler, 1882; Chilesia rudis (Butler, 1882)

= Paracles rudis =

Species of moth

Paracles rudis is a moth of the subfamily Arctiinae first described by Arthur Gardiner Butler in 1882. It is found in Chile.
