= Paracles reversa =

Scientific classification
- Kingdom: Animalia
- Phylum: Arthropoda
- Clade: Pancrustacea
- Class: Insecta
- Order: Lepidoptera
- Superfamily: Noctuoidea
- Family: Erebidae
- Subfamily: Arctiinae
- Tribe: Arctiini
- Subtribe: Spilosomina
- Genus: Paracles
- Species: P. reversa

Binomial name
- Paracles reversa (E. D. Jones, 1908)

Synonyms
- Antarctia reversa E. D. Jones, 1908

Species of moth

Paracles reversa is a moth of the subfamily Arctiinae first described by E. Dukinfield Jones in 1908. It is found in Brazil.
