= Paracles toulgoeti =

Scientific classification
- Domain: Eukaryota
- Kingdom: Animalia
- Phylum: Arthropoda
- Class: Insecta
- Order: Lepidoptera
- Superfamily: Noctuoidea
- Family: Erebidae
- Subfamily: Arctiinae
- Genus: Paracles
- Species: P. toulgoeti

Binomial name
- Paracles toulgoeti Watson & Goodger, 1986

Synonyms
- Mallocephala venata Rothschild, 1910

Species of moth

Paracles toulgoeti is a moth of the subfamily Arctiinae first described by Watson and Goodger in 1986 found in Brazil.
