= Paracles postflavida =

Scientific classification
- Domain: Eukaryota
- Kingdom: Animalia
- Phylum: Arthropoda
- Class: Insecta
- Order: Lepidoptera
- Superfamily: Noctuoidea
- Family: Erebidae
- Subfamily: Arctiinae
- Genus: Paracles
- Species: P. postflavida

Binomial name
- Paracles postflavida (Rothschild, 1922)

Synonyms
- Palustra postflavida Rothschild, 1922

Species of moth

Paracles postflavida is a moth in the subfamily Arctiinae, first described by Rothschild in 1922. It is found in Peru.
