= Eurysthea =

Scientific classification
- Kingdom: Animalia
- Phylum: Arthropoda
- Class: Insecta
- Order: Coleoptera
- Suborder: Polyphaga
- Infraorder: Cucujiformia
- Family: Cerambycidae
- Subfamily: Cerambycinae
- Tribe: Elaphidiini
- Genus: Eurysthea; Thomson, 1861

Synonyms
- Mallocera Lacordaire 1869; Euristhea Lacordaire 1869; Paramallocera Aurivillius 1912

Genus of beetles

Eurysthea is a genus of beetles in the family Cerambycidae, containing the following species:

- Eurysthea antonkozlovi Botero & Santos-Silva, 2017
- Eurysthea barsevskisi Botero & Santos-Silva, 2017
- Eurysthea caesariata (Martins, 1995)
- Eurysthea cribripennis (Bates, 1885)
- Eurysthea hirca (Berg, 1889)
- Eurysthea hirta (Kirby, 1818)
- Eurysthea ilinizae (Kirsch, 1889)
- Eurysthea koepckei (Franz, 1956)
- Eurysthea lacordairei (Lacordaire, 1869)
- Eurysthea latefasciata (Fonseca-Gessner, 1990)
- Eurysthea llinasi Taboada-Verona & Botero, 2018
- Eurysthea magnifica Martins, 1985
- Eurysthea martinsi (Fonseca-Gessner, 1990)
- Eurysthea nakagomei Botero, Heffern & Santos-Silva, 2018
- Eurysthea nearnsi Botero & Santos-Silva, 2017
- Eurysthea nicolai (Aurivillius, 1908)
- Eurysthea nogueirai Botero, Heffern & Santos-Silva, 2018
- Eurysthea obliqua (Audinet-Serville, 1834)
- Eurysthea parva Martins & Galileo, 2013
- Eurysthea punctata (Fonseca-Gessner, 1990)
- Eurysthea robertsi (Fonseca-Gessner, 1990)
- Eurysthea rotundicollis (Martins, 1995)
- Eurysthea sordida (Erichson, 1847)
- Eurysthea squamifera (Martins, 1967)
- Eurysthea subandina (Fonseca-Gessner, 1990)
- Eurysthea tatianakozlovae Botero & Santos-Silva, 2017
- Eurysthea vandenberghei Santos-Silva, Heffern & Botero, 2021
