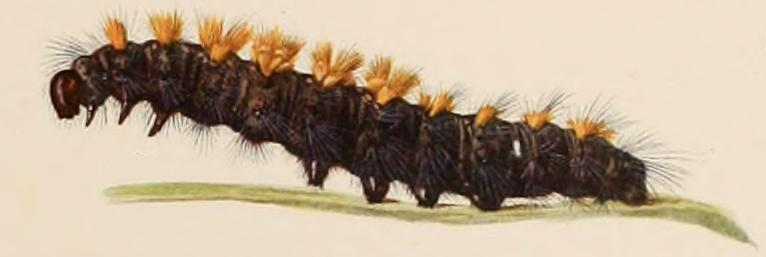
- Larva

Scientific classification
- Kingdom: Animalia
- Phylum: Arthropoda
- Clade: Pancrustacea
- Class: Insecta
- Order: Lepidoptera
- Superfamily: Noctuoidea
- Family: Erebidae
- Subfamily: Arctiinae
- Genus: Paracles
- Species: P. vulpina

Binomial name
- Paracles vulpina (Hübner, [1825])

Synonyms
- Antarctia vulpina Hübner, [1825]; Arctia pallicosta Boisduval, 1859

= Paracles vulpina =

Species of moth

Paracles vulpina is a moth of the subfamily Arctiinae first described by Jacob Hübner in 1825. It is found in Argentina and Brazil.
