= Paracles laboulbeni =

Scientific classification
- Domain: Eukaryota
- Kingdom: Animalia
- Phylum: Arthropoda
- Class: Insecta
- Order: Lepidoptera
- Superfamily: Noctuoidea
- Family: Erebidae
- Subfamily: Arctiinae
- Genus: Paracles
- Species: P. laboulbeni

Binomial name
- Paracles laboulbeni (Bar, 1873)

Synonyms
- Palustra laboulbeni Bar, 1873

Species of moth

Paracles laboulbeni is a moth of the subfamily Arctiinae described by M. Bar. It is found in Suriname and the Amazon rainforest.
