= Carlos Berg =

Argentine-Latvian naturalist and entomologist (1843–1902)

Carl Berg
- Kārlis Bergs
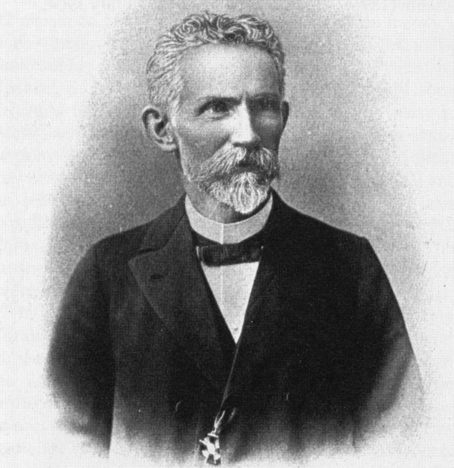
- Born: Friedrich Wilhelm Karl Berg; 2 April 1843; Tukums, Courland, Russian Empire
- Died: 19 January 1902 (aged 58); Buenos Aires, Argentina
- Scientific career
- Fields: Natural history; entomology

Carlos Berg (Latvian: Kārlis Bergs, German: Karl Berg) or Friedrich Wilhelm Karl Berg (Latvian: Frīdrihs Vilhelms Kārlis Bergs, German: Friedrich Wilhelm Karl Berg) (2 April [O.S. 21 March] 1843 – 19 January 1902) was an Argentine naturalist and entomologist of Latvian and Baltic German origin.

== Early life ==
Berg was born on 2 April [O.S. 21 March] 1902 in Tukums, Courland.

== Career ==
Having worked a few years in trade, he moved to Riga in 1865 and became curator of the entomological department of the Riga Museum, and then at the Riga Technical University.

In 1873, he was invited by Hermann Burmeister (1807–1892), director of the Museum of Buenos Aires, to join him in Argentina. As early as 1874, Berg began an expedition to Patagonia to collect specimens for the museum. This first collecting trip was followed by others through Argentina, also in Chile and Uruguay.

Apart from a period of two years from 1890 to 1892, spent at the Museo Nacional in Montevideo, he was based in Buenos Aires. He replaced Burmeister as the head of the museum in 1892.

His first specialty was entomology, but he was also dedicated to paleontology and the study of vertebrates. Amongst his many other achievements, he described Cactoblastis cactorum, the cactus moth.

Berg was a fellow of the Entomological Society of London and a corresponding member of the Zoological Society of London.

== Works ==
- 1875: Lepidópteros patagónicos. Observados en el viage de 1874 Acta Acad. Nac. Cordova, 1 (4): 63-102, (7): 155-158 Suplemento a la descripción de los lepidópteros patagónicos
- 1875: Patagonische Lepidopteren beobachtet auf einer Reise im Jahre 1874 Bull. Soc. Imp. Nat. Moscou 49 (4) : 191-247
- 1879: Hemiptera argentina enumeravit speciesque novas descripsit Carolus Berg Bonariae, ex typographiae P.E. Coni
- 1877: Contribución al estudio de la fauna entomológica de Patagonia An. Soc. Cient. Argent. 4 (2): 87-102, : 199-211
- 1877: Beiträge zu den Lepidoptoren Patagoniens Bull. Soc. imp. Nat. Moscou 52 (3) : 1-22
- 1877: Estudios Lepidopterológicus acerce de la fauna Argentina y oriental An. Soc. cient. Argent. 3 : 228-242, pl. [1]
- 1877: Descriptions de deux nouveaux Lépidoptères de la famille des Arctiadae Ann. Soc. Ent. Fr. (5) 7 : 189-194
- 1880: Observaciones acerca de la Familia Hyponomeutidae. Anales de la Sociedad Cientifica Argentina. 1880;10:99–109.
- 1885: Lepidoptera Nova, Faunae reipublicae Argentinae et Uruguayensis An. Soc. cient. argent. 19 : 266-285
- 1889 : Substitucion de nombres genericos. III. Comm. Mus. Nac. Buenos Aires, 1 : 77-80.
- 1896 : Batraccios Argentinos.
- 1898 : Contribuciones... Fauna Erpetologica Argentina.

== See also ==
- Category:Taxa named by Carlos Berg

== Sources ==
- Anonym 1902 [Berg, F. W. K.] Entomologist's Monthly Magazine (3), London 38:114
- Gallardo, A. 1897 [Berg, F. W. K.] An. Soc. Cient. Argent., Buenos Aires 43 : 274-279, Portrait
- Osborn, H. 1937 Fragments of Entomological History Including Some Personal Recollections of Men and Events Columbus, Ohio, Published by the Author 1 : 1-394, 47
- Groll, E. K. (Hrsg.): Biografien der Entomologen der Welt : Datenbank. Version 4.15 : Senckenberg Deutsches Entomologisches Institut, 2010 Berg, Friedrich Wilhelm Karl
