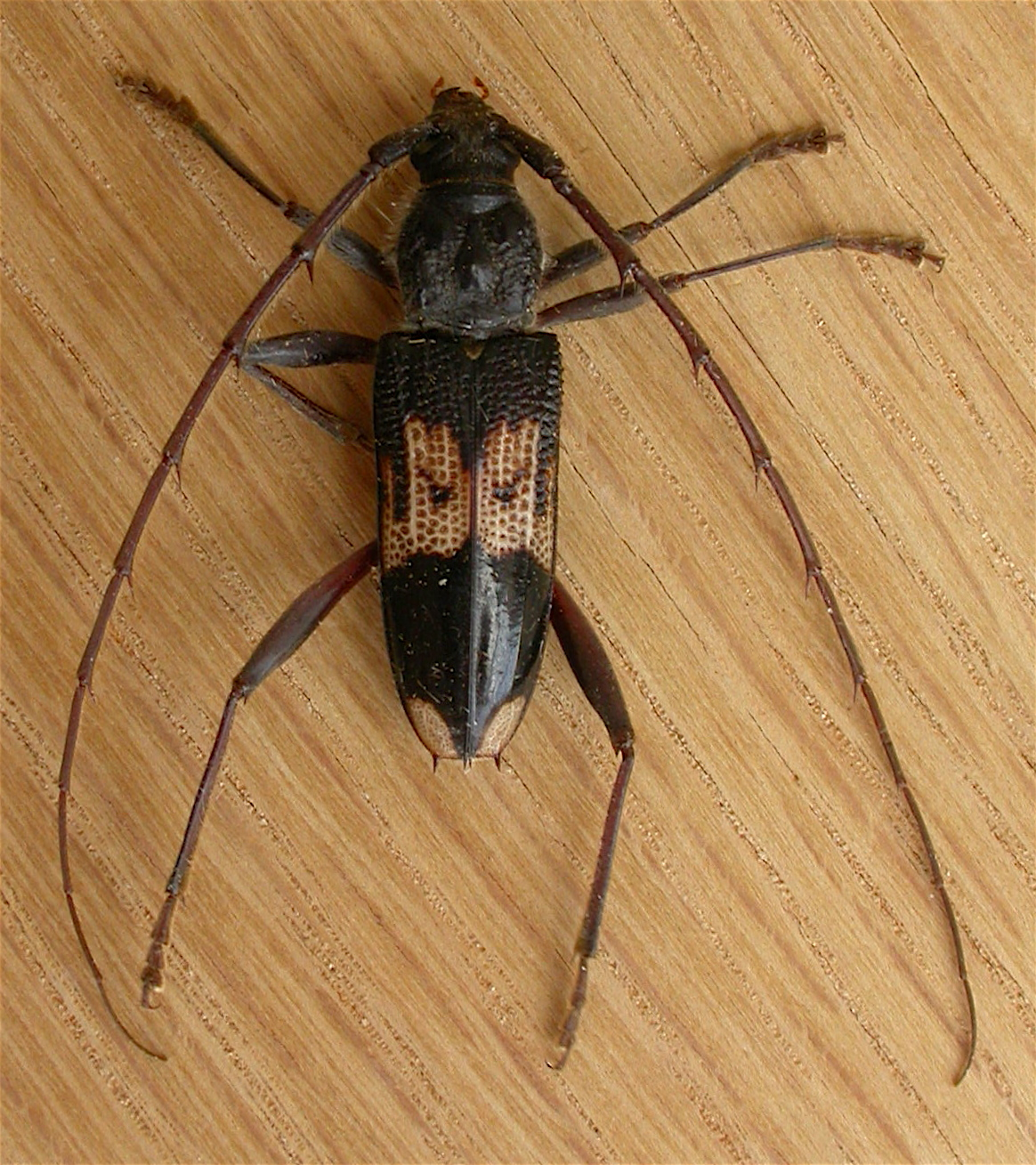

Scientific classification
- Kingdom: Animalia
- Phylum: Arthropoda
- Clade: Pancrustacea
- Class: Insecta
- Order: Coleoptera
- Suborder: Polyphaga
- Infraorder: Cucujiformia
- Family: Cerambycidae
- Genus: Phoracantha
- Species: P. semipunctata

Binomial name
- Phoracantha semipunctata (Fabricius, 1775)

= Phoracantha semipunctata =

Species of beetle

Phoracantha semipunctata, the Australian Eucalyptus longhorn, is a species of beetle in the family Cerambycidae. Native to Australia, it has now spread to many parts of the world, including practically all countries where tree species of Eucalyptus have been introduced. It has been classified as an invasive pest species of Eucalyptus outside Australia.

Within Australia, Phoracantha semipunctata primarily seeks for decaying trees and branches which have been critically impaired due to natural disasters. In other regions of the world, it inflicts critical damage upon introduced Eucalyptus trees. However, the damage inflicted by Phoracantha semipunctata may be seen as a positive factor in some regions, as Eucalyptus trees that are introduced are seen as invasive plant species imposing harm on the natural environment.

Phoracantha semipunctata are typically dark brown & beige in colour and are approximately similar in size measuring at around 2.3cm long. They are primarily active during the more temperate initial dusk hours, and are found in populations within host trees, which are predominantly male-oriented. These host trees are determined according to the suitability of adult mating and oviposition, and the viability of larvae development.

== Taxonomy ==
Phoracantha semipunctata was initially observed in the late 1980s in Setúbal, Portugal. The beetle is classified as a species within the Phoracantha genus, situated within the Phoracanthini tribe of beetles under the Cerambycinae subfamily, which it shares with 11 other genera including Coptocercus, Allotisis, Thoris, Epithora, Skeletodes, Atesta, Paratesta, Steata, Coleocoptus, Phytrocaria, and Semiphoracantha. Adult beetles within the Cerambycidae family are generally recognised as "longicorn" or "longhorned" beetles, due to their especially long antennae.

- Phoracanthini (Beetle tribe)
  - Coptocercus
  - Allotsis
  - Thoris
  - Epithora
  - Skeletodes
  - Atesta
  - Paratessaropa
  - Steata
  - Coleocoptus
  - Phytrocaria
  - Semiphoracantha
  - Phoracantha

== Description ==
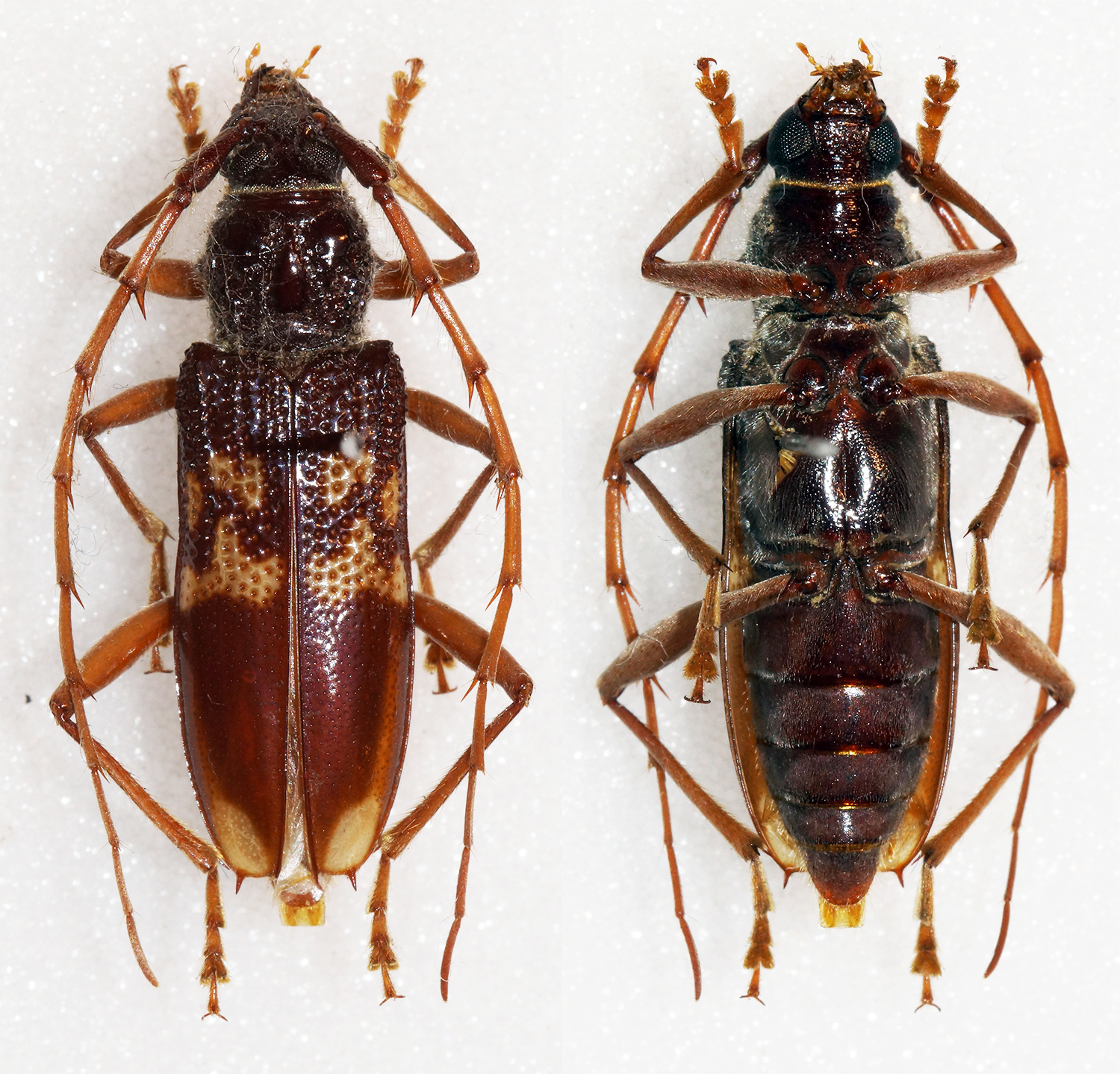
Top view and bottom view of an adult Phoracantha semipunctata

Phoracantha semipunctata ranges from 15-23 mm in length; however, females are recorded to be slightly larger than their male counterparts. Their bodies are of a darker reddish colour, and typically consists of a protruding spine at the end. Adults are primarily found during the spring and summer seasons, coming out during the evening hours, commonly feeding on pollen & nectar within host trees.

It is similar to the related P. recurva, but differs in the larger size and more extensive dark markings.

=== Elytra ===
The wings of Phoracantha semipunctata are predominantly dark brown and cream in colour, with a zigzag line dividing the cream coloured area of the elytra. Being crepuscular insects, adult flight activity is restricted to the warmer evening hours, when temperatures are above 15 degrees celsius. Adults fly, seeking mates and females scout for any potential areas in which they can oviposit. Flight activity is determined by host tree odours. This influences adults to fly in a more upwind motion and land on specific areas of the tree, and also acts as a factor upon when they fly-off. When adults acquire a distinct sense for the odour, they fly in a manner where they move in a compressed non-linear motion. When searching for a host tree, adults utilise a specific flight mechanic that consists of an odour oriented optomotor and autonomous contrary zig-zag movements.

=== Antennae ===
The antennae of Phoracantha semipunctata adults serve as peripheral sensory tools, which help identify key environmental factors, including host tree determination. These antennas exhibit a broad category of sensilla, including olfaction, gustation, mechanoreception and thermo and hygroreception. The length of male and female antennas are distinct to each other, where male antennae — 29-33mm — are longer than female antennas — 19-26mm. Antennae are typically equivalent in length, in comparison to its body; however, may measure out to be slightly longer. The structural foundation of its antenna is composed of 11 distinct components — scape, pedicel and nine flagellomeres consisting in the flagellum. There are two types of sensilla basiconica that can be found on the flagellomeres of the flagellum. This includes sensilla basiconica I and sensilla basiconica II. Sensilla basiconica 1 is distributed all across the flagellomeres of the flagellum, where they are shaped as dull pointed tips, typically bent closer to the base. These sensilla protrude from a detached surface and are approximately 20-26 μm long and 2.5-3.0 μm wide at its base, and gradually decreases to 0.9-1.2 μm as it thins out towards the top. The epidermal layer typically spans from 0.25-0.35 μm in width, on its base. Sensilla basiconica II are also found on its antenna’s flagellomeres. This form of sensilla are purely linear, dull pointed protruding tips that arise from a levitated surface, and are approximately 10-20 μm long and 2.5-4 μm wide, gradually narrowing out to 1.5 - 2 μm towards the top.

== Distribution & habitat ==
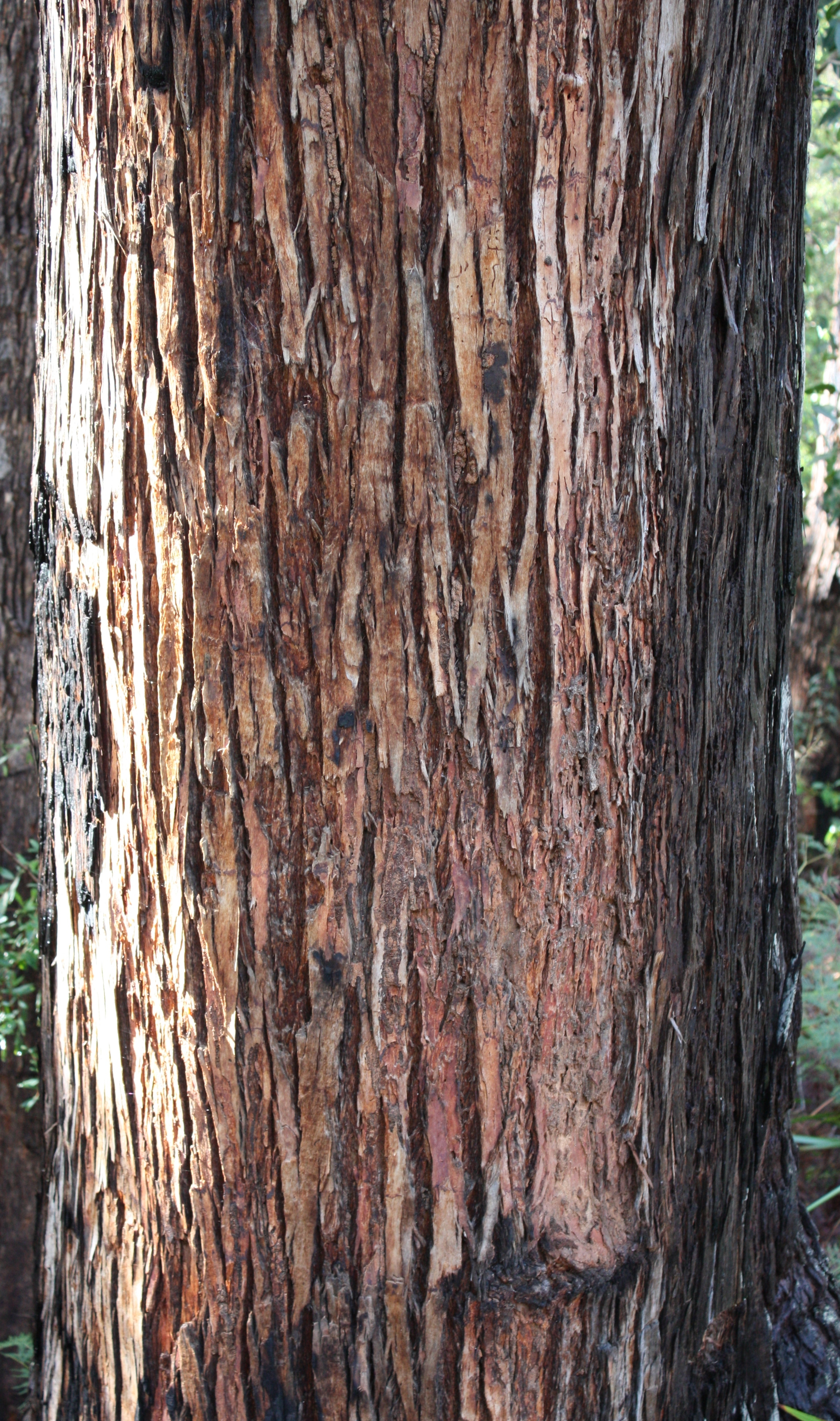
The external bark surface of a jarrah tree

Phoracantha semipunctata was first deemed as an insect pest problem in 1906 in South Africa. They have now spread across all regions around the world, and typically affect areas characterised by arid heat and areas with an abundance of Eucalyptus plants. The main cause of invasion is not completely known; however, the process of dunnage may be one of the key factors responsible for the degree of invasiveness of the species. The transportation of beetle populated firewood, is also another rationale which may explain its invasiveness. P. semipunctata is not considered as a major pest and a factor of much economic importance in its native country of Australia. Significant damage imposed by this eucalyptus borer is not common in Australia, as the majority of attacks are limited to trees subject to droughts. However, these insects have been found to impose damage amongst juvenile jarrah (Eucalyptus marginata) trees within the Southwestern region of Australia, primarily in bauxite mines which have been recently replanted. In their non-native ecosystems, they are considered as a major pest problem imposing a great amount of damage upon natural biodiversity, typically on trees that are placed under stress. This is primarily due to their inability to sufficiently accommodate to the new environmental conditions. Regions within the Northern Hemisphere including Palestine, the United States, and Morocco are examples in which these beetles have been proven to be a major pest problem. Within the Southern Hemisphere, they may also pose as a pest problem; however, in these regions, they are not regarded as a pest that is always causing critical damage upon flora. A greater abundance of P. semipunctata appear in non-native ecosystems, when populating host trees with a large diameter.

== Lifecycle ==
There are 4 key processes that occur within its lifecycle — Egg, larval, pupation and adult.

=== Egg ===
Female Phoracantha semipunctata lay approximately a batch of 40 eggs, where eggs are laid below detached bark, present within stressed host trees, during oviposition. During the process, the ovipositor of females can stretch up to 2cm. Eggs measure at around 2.5mm to 3mm and are of a yellow colour, shaped in an elongated oval, and may require 1 to 2 weeks to hatch, based on the weather conditions.

=== Larvae ===
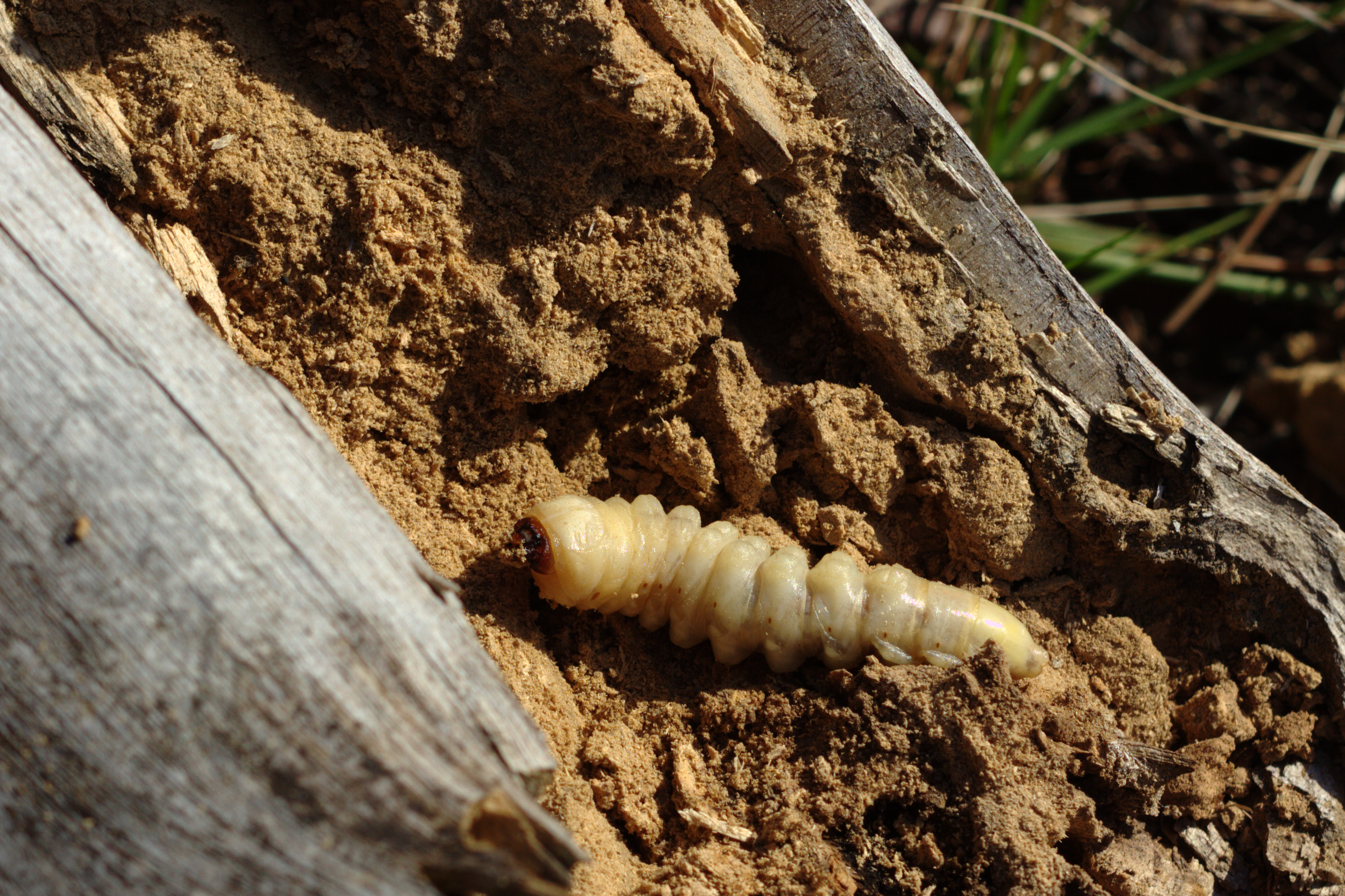
Cerambycidae larvae

After the eggs hatch, larvae emerge and begin acquiring nutrients from the cambium and phloem segments, excavating through the external layer of bark to consume in the inner bark and exterior xylem tissues. This is done up to the point they turn into mature larvae, as these tree tissues have the most nutrient content to facilitate the larvae’s development. The degree of density of bark is a component, which has an influence upon the trajectory of larvae development as these areas serve as regions providing adequate sapwood for larvae consumption. This contributes to lower larvae mortality rates and also a greater possibility of more emergence of adult Phoracantha semipunctata. The degree of oviposition also has an effect on the survivorship of larvae. With a greater rate of oviposition occurring, there will be a higher rate of competition between larvae and a lower rate of survival for larvae.

Larvae which complete sufficient development before winter are likely to develop into larger sized adults, as nutritional resources are of higher quality before the season. The nutritional resources, which the host provides is also a factor which influences the degree of sizeable growth and fitness of larvae throughout its development. During the process of larval development, feeding can be undertaken to such an extent where it may impose critical damage upon the host, potentially diminishing the whole cambium zone of the tree, and killing the whole tree in general. Critical tree damage typically occurs during this larvae feeding period. Larvae nearing their development will over time begin to diverge away from the initial oviposition site, in order to feed on the phloem and external layers of sapwood, as food sources situated closer to the oviposition site are not as beneficial and nutritious for them. Larvae generally require up to 2.5 months to sufficiently develop into mature larvae, where they typically measure out at around 30-40mm in length, and are of a cream shade, exhibiting no legs. Individual larvae can sustain themselves within branches of just 5cm in diameter. The amount of time it takes larvae to fully develop; however, may vary according to host conditions. When host logs; trees are fresher larvae will take up to 70 days to complete development. If host logs; trees are more arid, this will prolong larvae development, where it may require up to 180 days to complete.

=== Pupation ===
Pupation will occur after larvae development. Larvae Phoracantha semipunctata, will establish pupal chambers, within the sapwood or in some cases the heartwood, where they will develop into adult beetles. Pupation may take up to 10 days. During this process, intraspecific competition is present, as the development of other larvae may be constricted, due to the formation of the pupal chamber resulting in the depletion of nutritional food source, available to other larvae, primarily in the form of sapwood. The time which larvae take to pupate will vary according to climate. During warmer climates, larvae will undergo pupation at a faster rate, in comparison to development occurring within colder climates. In colder climates, larvae will typically go through an inactive period pre-pupation stage, where they resume development during the spring season.

=== Adult ===
After pupation, adult Phoracantha semipunctata will then begin digging themselves out the pupal chamber in which they will then create a 8-10mm opening in the external bark layer. The total life cycle of P. semipunctata varies; however, in host trees with high larvae competition, their total lifecycle may be significantly depleted and only span up to two months. However, in some regions around the world, such as Southern California, adults may appear at different times, where these borers are present all throughout the end of spring to the end of autumn. The complete lifecycle of P. semipunctata varies from season to season. In the spring and summer seasons, these beetles may only require 3 to 4 months to complete its lifecycle; however, during autumn and winter, beetles may require up to 9 months in order to complete its lifecycle.

== Behaviour & ecology ==
Phoracantha semipunctata are more active in the earlier warmer evening hours, and are found in host trees primarily characterised by a more male ratio based population. Being an Eucalyptus long-horned borer, these beetles predominantly targets host trees which are impaired in condition.

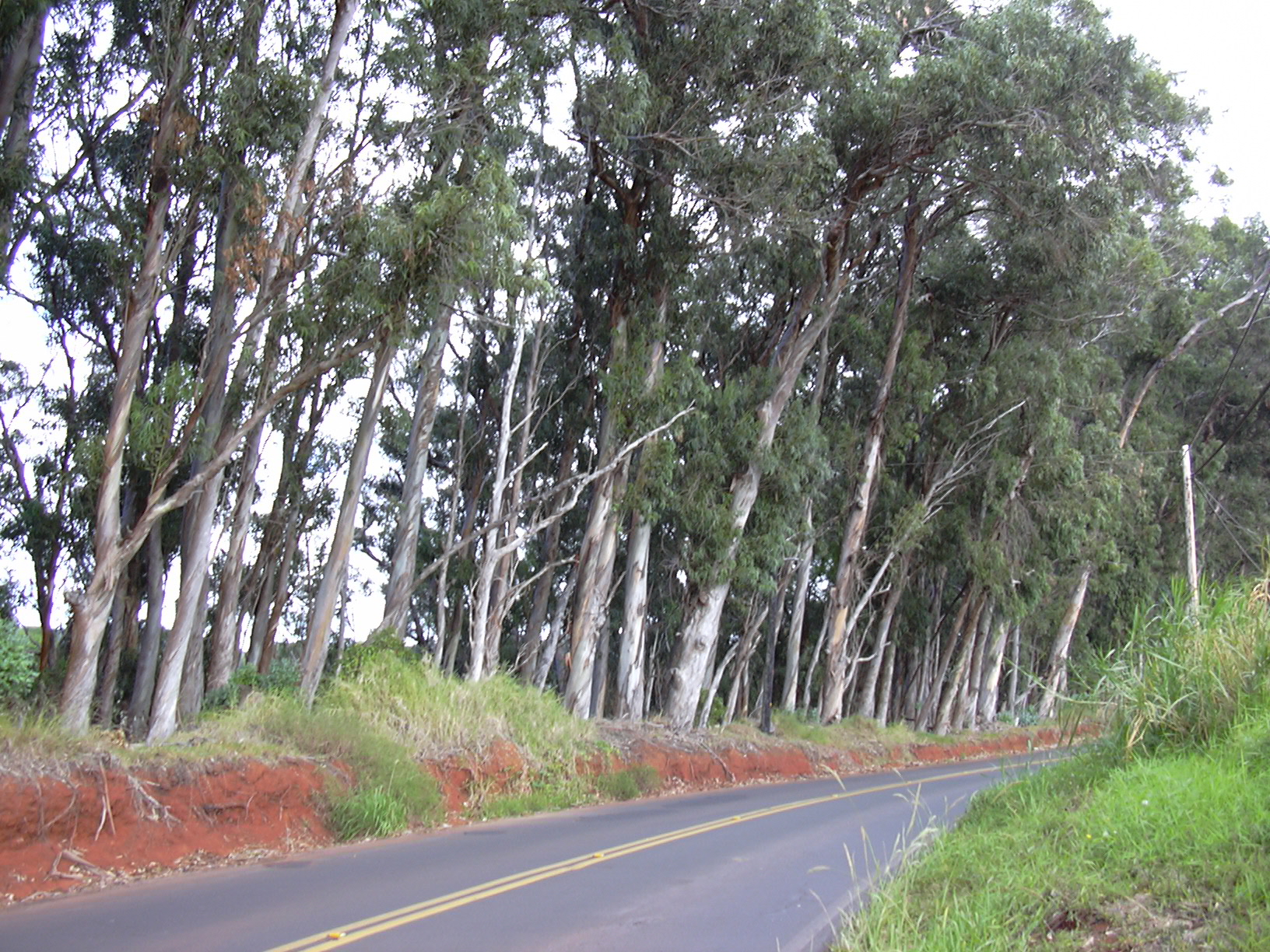
Eucalyptus globulus

=== Host determination ===
Phoracantha semipunctata's antennae serve as primary olfactory tools, enabling them to distinguish certain environmental factors — one of them being the detection of host tree determination. The degree of olfaction effectiveness is indicative by the movement of adult beetles towards single stressed host trees and by their movement towards host trees, characterised by fresher conditions. By utilising olfaction to distinguish between host tree odours, adults are able to discriminate certain plant species which do not exhibit certain components and volatiles, shared by host plant species. However, adult beetles do not single out host trees; logs based on vision or contact with bark surface, within a constricted area. The decision for adults to decide upon host trees, lies upon two underlying factors — oviposition preference and the degree of larvae performance.

During oviposition, female adults cannot afford to choose poor host tree species, as it is crucial for them to distinguish which host trees will provide adequate conditions for the sufficient development and survivorship of larvae. As larvae are exclusively constricted to their larval hosts, adult females will base their decision according to oviposition suitability, in respective of various factors including the degree of predation on larvae, larvae density within ecosystems, and nutrients available for adult P. semipunctata consumption. Adults may be placed under selective tension, if larvae require fresh host conditions to develop within. Larvae mortality was found to be significantly lower in Eucalyptus cladocalyx relative to the hybrid E. trabutii, considering at normal population density levels. These Eucalyptus host species were respectively recorded to be the least and most attractive to adult P. semipunctata. At lower population density levels, larvae mortality was lowest in E. camaldulensis and E. trabutii, relative to other Eucalyptus such as E. cladocalyx, and E. grandis. Adult beetles are found to be most drawn to Eucalyptus host species, which provide the best conditions for neonate development, under lower larvae density conditions. Under high oviposition conditions, larvae mortality will be typically greater, due to the degree of larvae competition there is within these sites. This is largely a result of the cannibalistic competition and a lack of nutritional sources available for the consumption of larvae situated within later stages of development.

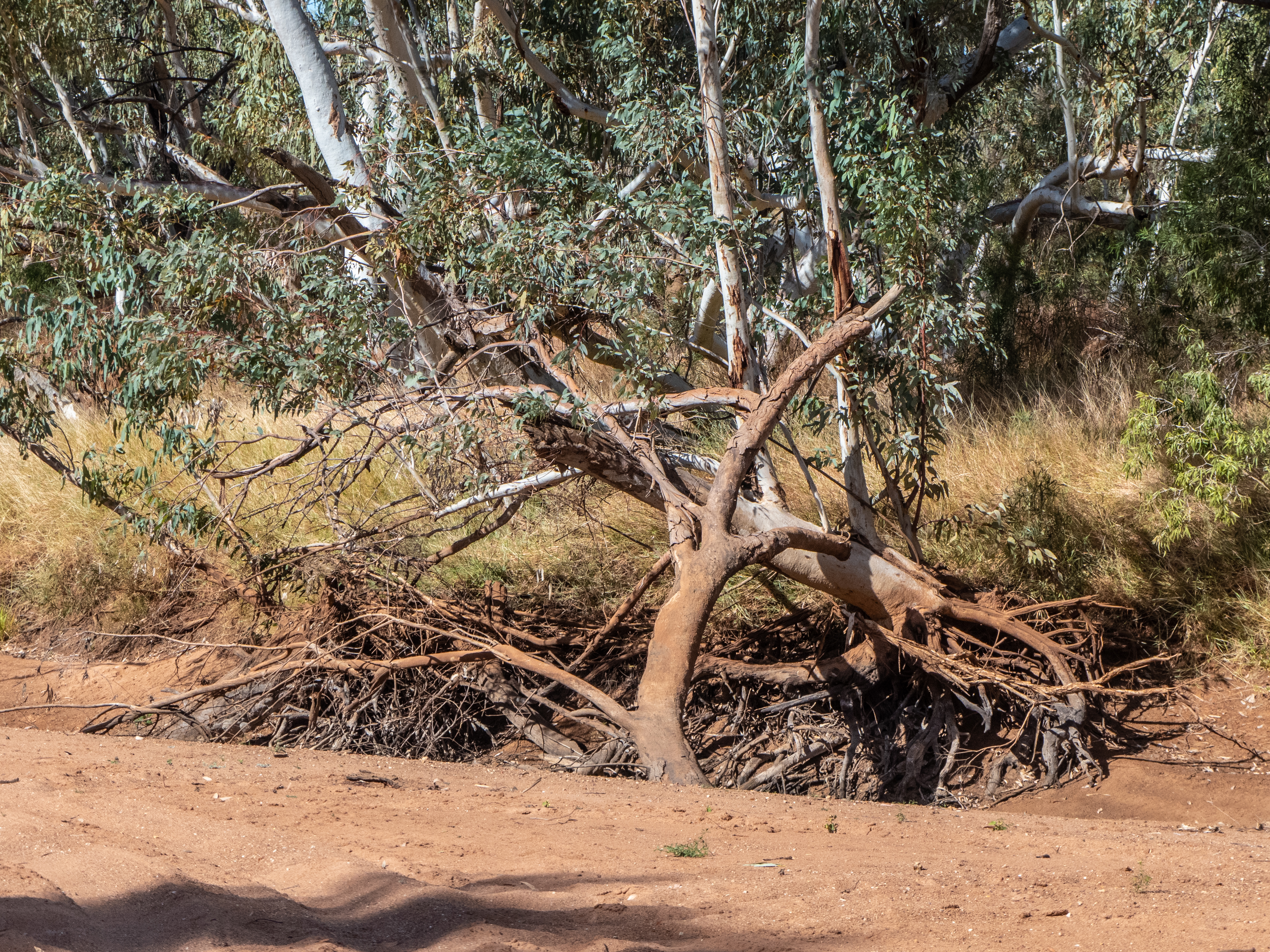
Eucalyptus camaldulensis in Central Western Queensland

There are various Eucalyptus species, which are regarded as most liable to P. semipunctata infestation. This consists of species such as E. globulus, and E. gomphocephala. Other Eucalyptus species such as E. camaldulensis, and E. cladocalyx, display some degree of protection to these borer's attacks. However, species such as E. torquata, E. salmonophloia and E. brockwayi, are classified as highly resistant to borer attacks.

=== Mating ===
There is a contrast between male and female adult Phoracantha semipunctata behaviour towards mating. Females are found typically slowly wandering around the external layer of bark of the larval hosts, seeking to find areas where they can potentially oviposit their eggs. During this process, female adults often stop to deposit eggs for a short period of time, before continuing wandering on the external layer of bark. Males on the other hand are constantly seeking a female to mate with, and depend upon antennal contact in order to detect female mates. Contrary to the slow movements of females on larval hosts, males travelled approximately 21% faster in comparison to females, and only stopped at the point of antennal contact with a female. From a trial conducted, adult P. semipunctata mating solely depend upon the ability of males to detect females to mate with. Upon male antennae contact, each interaction between male and female adults resulted in mating.

Mating is conducted in periodical time intervals, where it can last for a few hours. Males will continue to be paired with the female gripping the female's elytra with their front legs, until the point of oviposition. After oviposition occurs, both females and males separate. Due to there being a male-dominated population within host trees, males will try to protect their female mate, often taking violent measures by taunting other males with their antennae and also through biting. This contributes to the reason why, adult males have typically damaged antennae and ligaments, in comparison to females. Over the lifetime of P. semipunctata, adult females may have multiple mates, especially within host trees where population density is large.

=== Natural predators ===
Phoracantha semipunctata eggs and larvae are subject to various natural predators which may diminish their viability, during the development process. Braconid parasitoids, including Syngaster lepidus, and Bracon capitator have been recorded to impose negative effects upon larvae survivorship. Female wasps of this nature infuse a certain venom within the larvae, prior to oviposition, halting any further development and feeding that can be done by the P. semipunctata larvae host. There are also other species of beetle which impose lower larvae survivorship, including Trogodendron fasciculatum and Aeschyntelus vittatus. Ants are estimated to have extracted 36% of beetle eggs within Eucalyptus trees; however, the degree of damage they directly impose on the P. semipunctata population have not been analysed. In California, the egg parasitoid, Avetianella longoi, has been recorded to be responsible for disposing of roughly greater than 90% of P. semipunctata eggs.

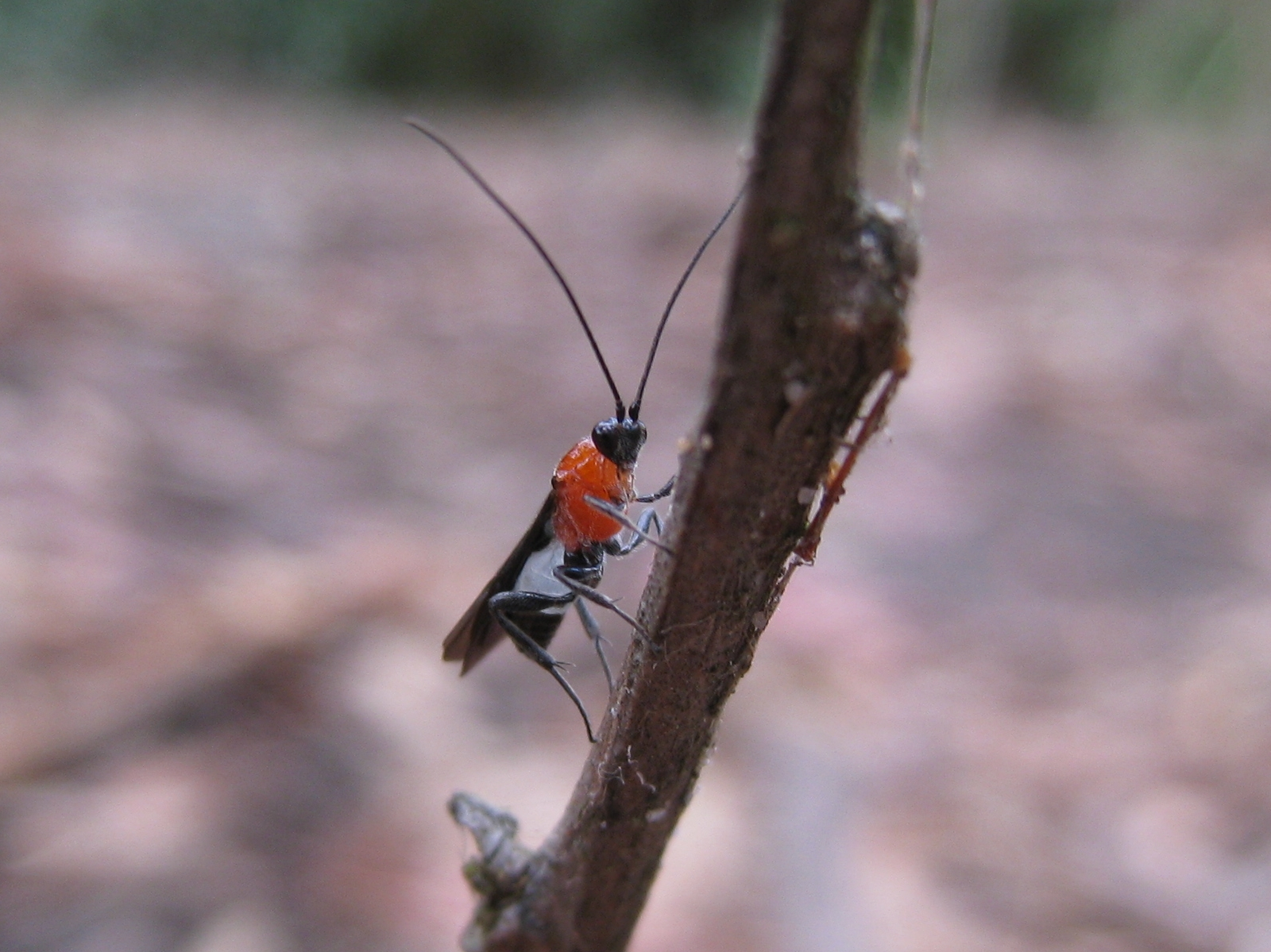
Braconid wasp mounted on a tree

== Management ==
The resilience of Eucalyptus species is influenced by the degree of maintenance taken to preserve the conditions of host trees. The provision of sufficient water during long durations of dry condition, is a measure that may be implemented to mitigate the effects in which these beetles may impose on the natural environment. Avoiding a regular schedule of irrigation may increase trees' susceptibility to more frequent longhorn borer attacks. During the process of irrigation, shallow watering is avoided, as this can substantially diminish the condition of the tree root. Facilitating the degree of dryness of host species, through taking off the bark of stressed trees, is also a measure that may be implemented to reduce the period of time beetles are able to develop, and also serve as a control measure imposed to mitigate the environmental damage caused by the Eucalyptus longhorn borer.

There are certain Eucalyptus species which are more resilient to Phoracantha semipunctata infestation. These species are typically adapted to more arid climates.

Liability levels of Eucalyptus species to Phoracantha semipunctata
Liable	Resilient
Eucalyptus globulus 'blue gum'	Eucalyptus trabutii (hybrid)
Eucalyptus grandis 'flooded gum'	Eucalyptus citriodora 'lemon-scented gum'
Eucalyptus diversicolor 'karri gum'	Eucalyptus dalrympleana 'mountain gum'
Eucalyptus viminalis 'manna gum'	Eucalyptus camaldulensis 'river red gum'
Eucalyptus platypus 'moort/malook'	Eucalyptus sideroxylon 'red ironbark'
Eucalyptus nitens 'shining gum'	Eucalyptus cladocalyx 'sugar gum'
Eucalyptus saligna 'Sydney blue gum'	Eucalyptus robusta 'swamp mahogany'
