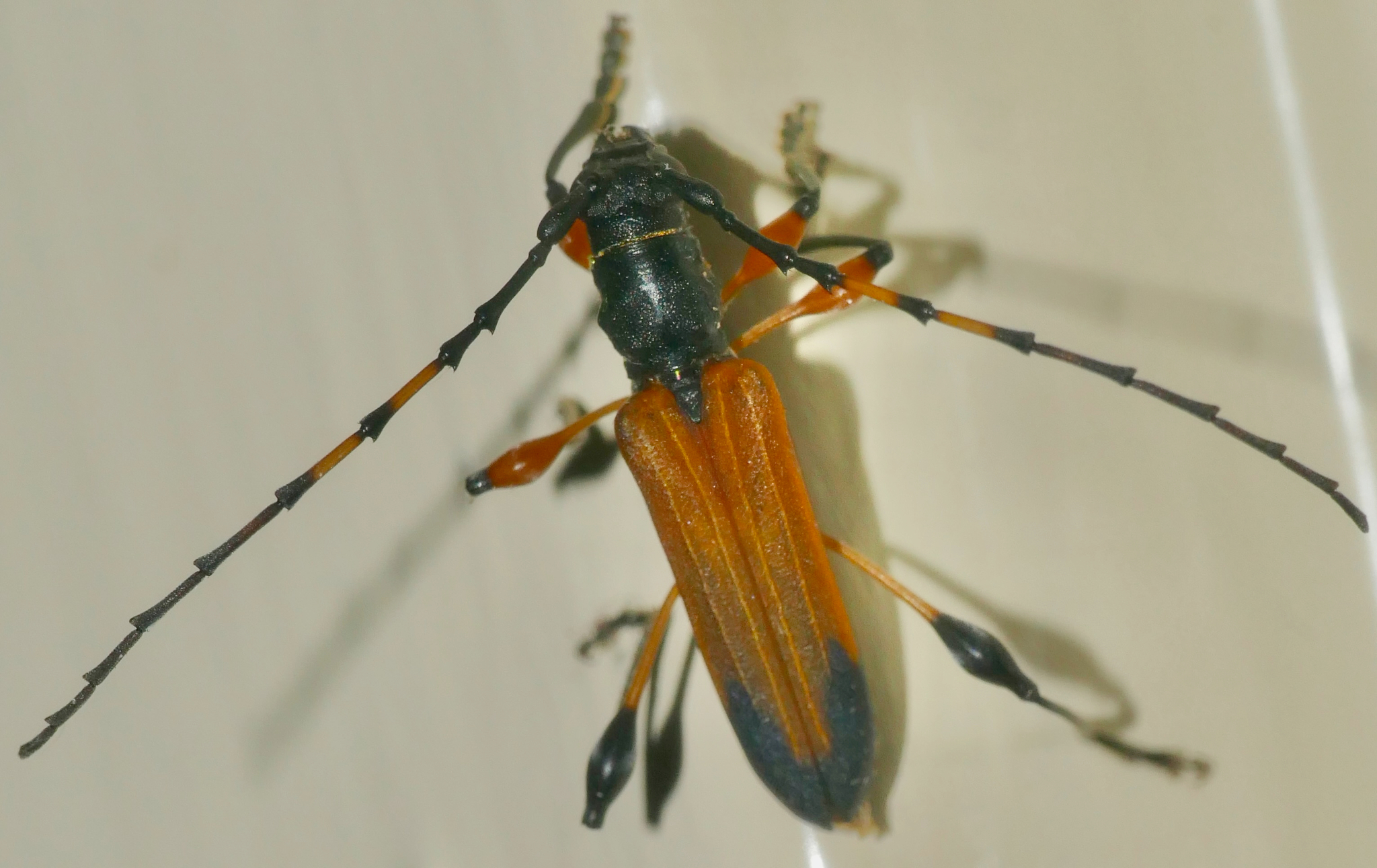
- Cordylomera elegans, South Africa

Scientific classification
- Kingdom: Animalia
- Phylum: Arthropoda
- Class: Insecta
- Order: Coleoptera
- Suborder: Polyphaga
- Infraorder: Cucujiformia
- Family: Cerambycidae
- Subfamily: Cerambycinae
- Tribe: Phoracanthini
- Genus: Cordylomera
- Species: C. elegans

Binomial name
- Cordylomera elegans Distant, 1904

Synonyms
- Cordylomera elegans caborabassae Veiga-Ferreira, 1971

= Cordylomera elegans =

Species of beetle

Cordylomera elegans is a species of longhorn beetle in the family Cerambycidae. It is found in Malawi, Mozambique, Zimbabwa, Zambia, and South Africa.
