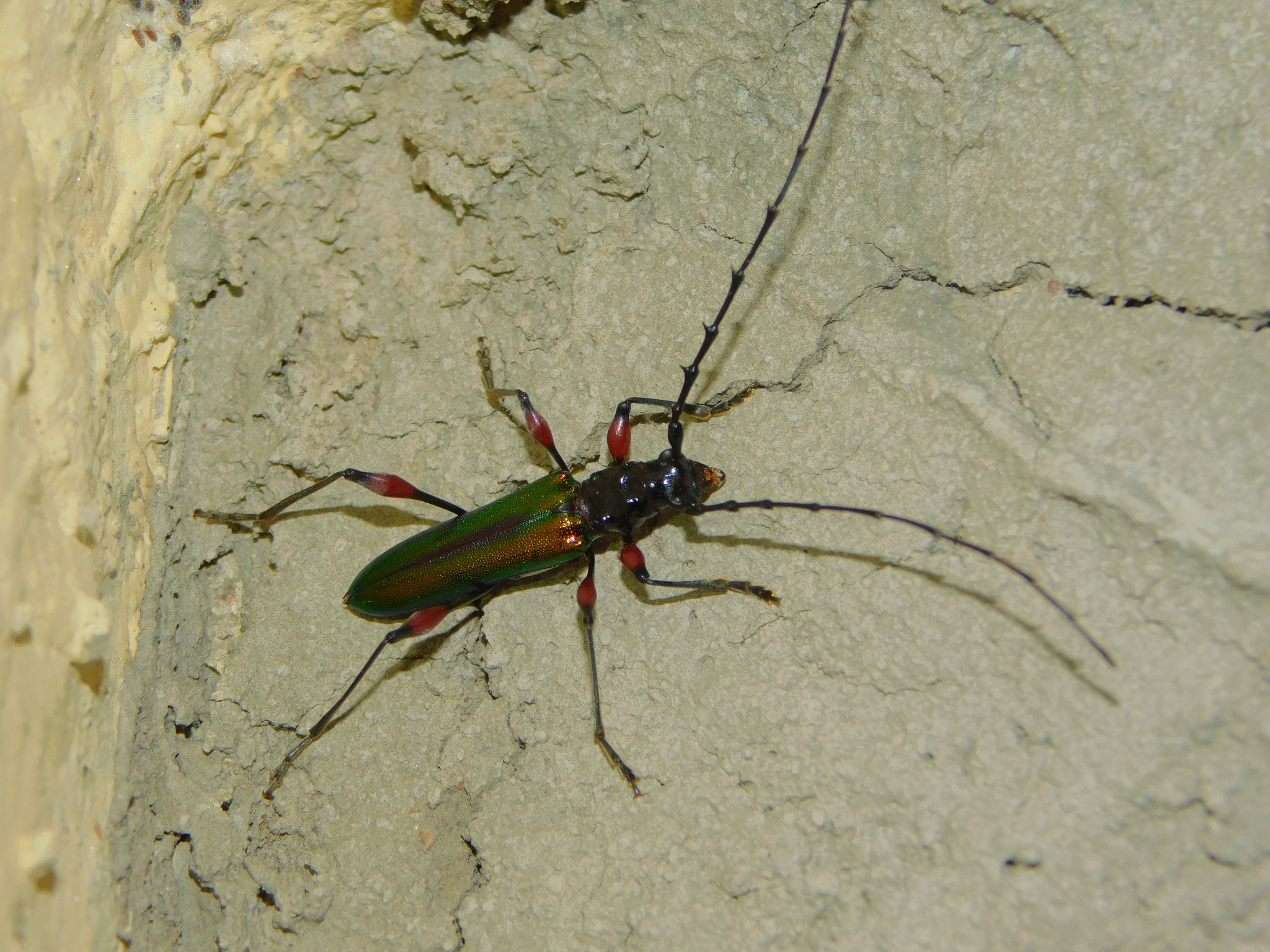
- Cordylomera spinicornis, Uganda

Scientific classification
- Domain: Eukaryota
- Kingdom: Animalia
- Phylum: Arthropoda
- Class: Insecta
- Order: Coleoptera
- Suborder: Polyphaga
- Infraorder: Cucujiformia
- Family: Cerambycidae
- Subfamily: Cerambycinae
- Tribe: Phoracanthini
- Genus: Cordylomera; Audinet-Serville, 1834

Synonyms
- Acanthinomomus Hope, 1835

= Cordylomera =

Genus of beetles

Cordylomera is a genus of longhorn beetles in the family Cerambycidae. There are more than 30 described species in Cordylomera. They are found mainly in Africa, and Cordylomera spinicornis is also found in Europe and Temperate Asia.

== Species ==
These 34 species belong to the genus Cordylomera:

- Cordylomera acuminata (Fabricius, 1776) (South Africa)
- Cordylomera annulicornis Fairmaire, 1892 (Africa)
- Cordylomera apicalis Thomson, 1858 (Cameroun, Gabon, Niger)
- Cordylomera atkinsoni Duffy, 1952 (Tanzania)
- Cordylomera basilewskyi Fuchs, 1971 (DR Congo)
- Cordylomera carvalhoi Veiga-Ferreira, 1971 (Angola)
- Cordylomera comoensis Adlbauer, 2000 (Ivory Coast)
- Cordylomera copei Adlbauer, 2001 (Cameroun)
- Cordylomera delahayei Adlbauer, 2006 (Gabon, Congo)
- Cordylomera elegans Distant, 1904 (Sub-Saharan Africa)
- Cordylomera etiennei Quentin & Villiers, 1979 (Comores Islands)
- Cordylomera filicornis Duffy, 1952 (Botswana, Namibia)
- Cordylomera geniculata Buquet, 1844 (Senegal)
- Cordylomera gracilis Veiga-Ferreira, 1965 (Mozambique, Zambie)
- Cordylomera gratiosa Murray, 1870 (Nigeria, Senegal)
- Cordylomera heimi Teocchi, 1973 (Central African Republic)
- Cordylomera inerme (Aurivillius, 1925) (Angola, Zimbabwe, Zambia, Malawi)
- Cordylomera inornata Duffy, 1952 (Sub-Saharan Africa)
- Cordylomera karschi Quedenfeldt, 1883 (Sub-Saharan Africa)
- Cordylomera laetitiae Teocchi, 1973 (Cameroun, Central African Republic)
- Cordylomera lepesmei Duffy, 1952 (Bénin, Senegal, Ivory Coast)
- Cordylomera maculata Adlbauer, 2012 (Zambie)
- Cordylomera minuta Duffy, 1952 (Senegal)
- Cordylomera mourgliai Adlbauer, 1994 (Ethiopia, Kenya, Tanzania)
- Cordylomera nyassae Corinta-Ferreira, 1957 (Malawi, Mozambique, Zimbabwe, Tanzania)
- Cordylomera parva Corinta-Ferreira, 1954 (Namibia)
- Cordylomera puchneri Adlbauer, 2004 (Kenya)
- Cordylomera rotundicollis Duffy, 1952 (Kenya)
- Cordylomera ruficornis Chevrolat, 1855 (Nigeria, Cameroon )
- Cordylomera schmidi Adlbauer, 2015 Cameroon
- Cordylomera schoenherrii Fåhraeus, 1872 (Sub-Saharan Africa)
- Cordylomera spinicornis (Fabricius, 1775) (Africa, Europe, and temperate Asia)
- Cordylomera vittata Jordan, 1903 (Tanzania)
- Cordylomera wieringai Adlbauer, 2001 (Gabon)
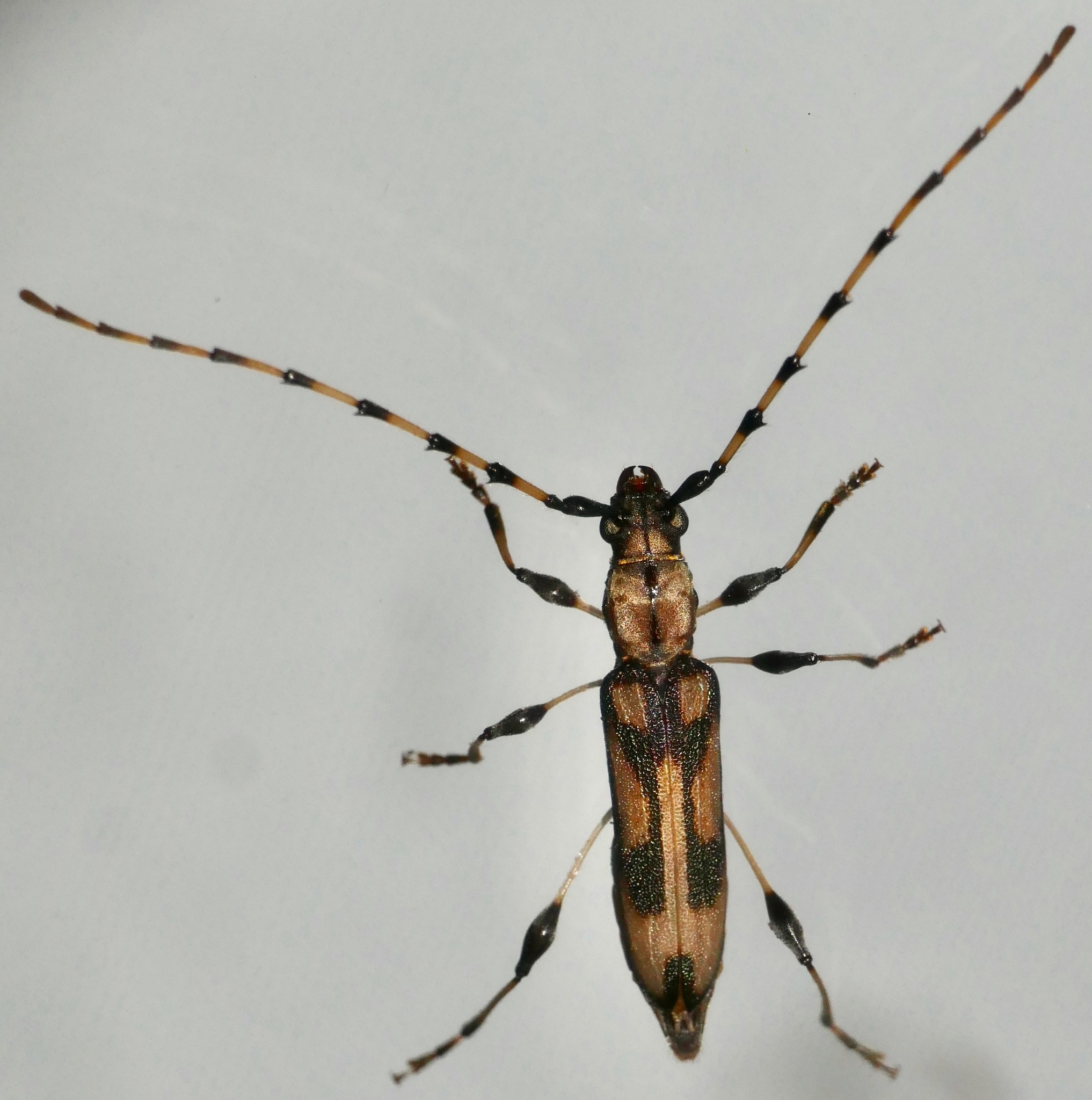
Cordylomera schoenherrii, South Africa

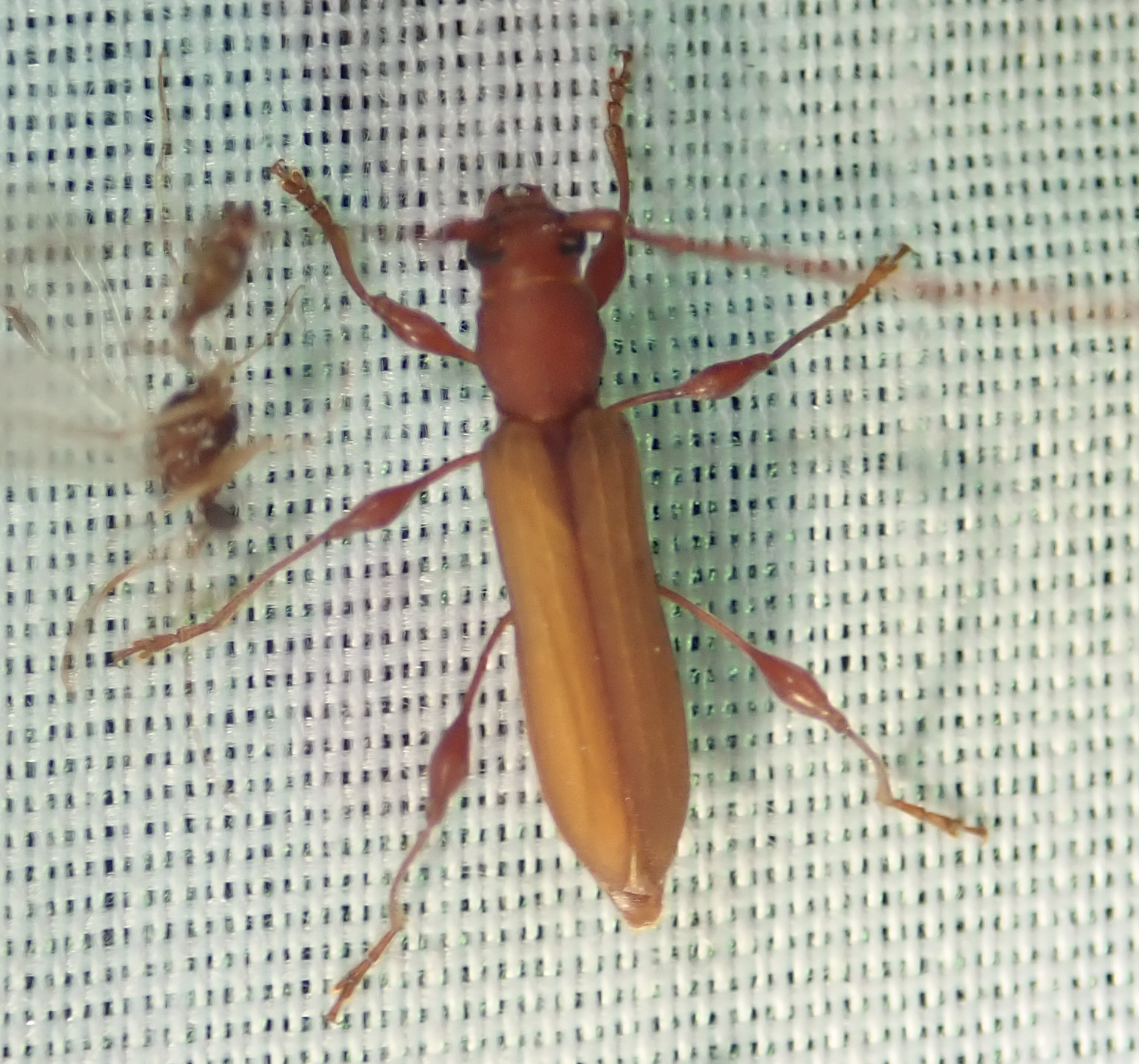
Cordylomera karschi, Botswana

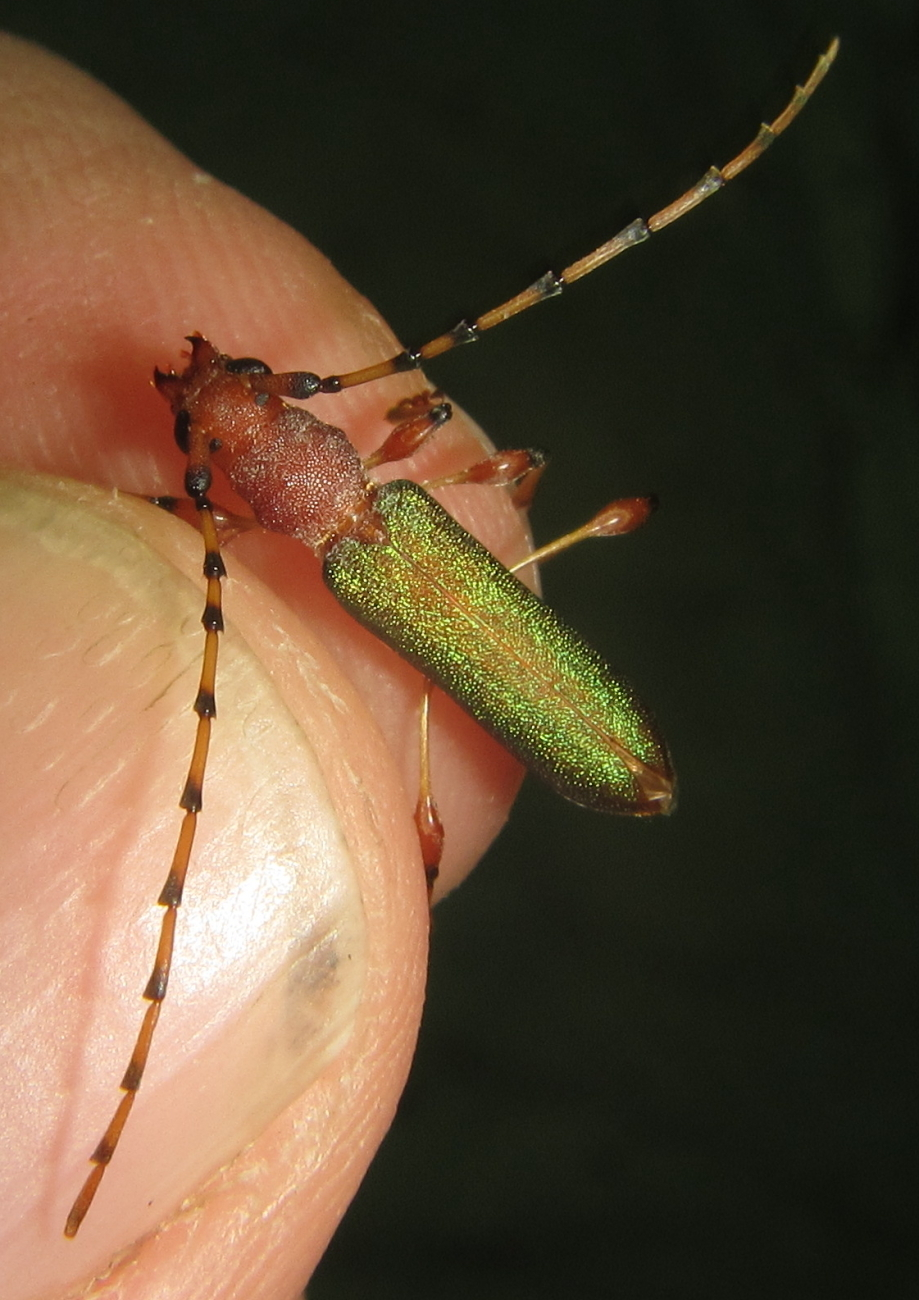
Cordylomera annulicornis, Botswana

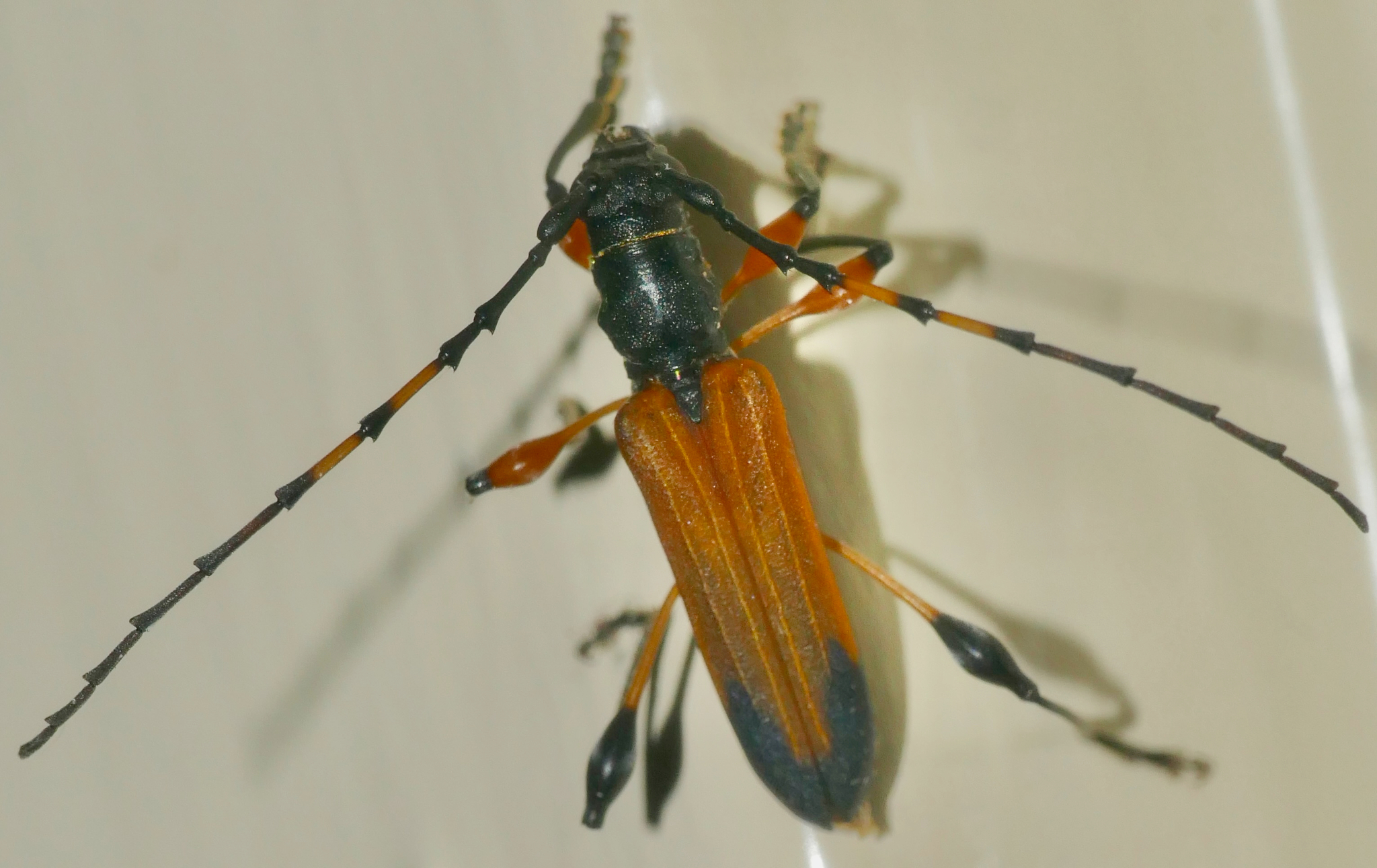
Cordylomera elegans, South Africa

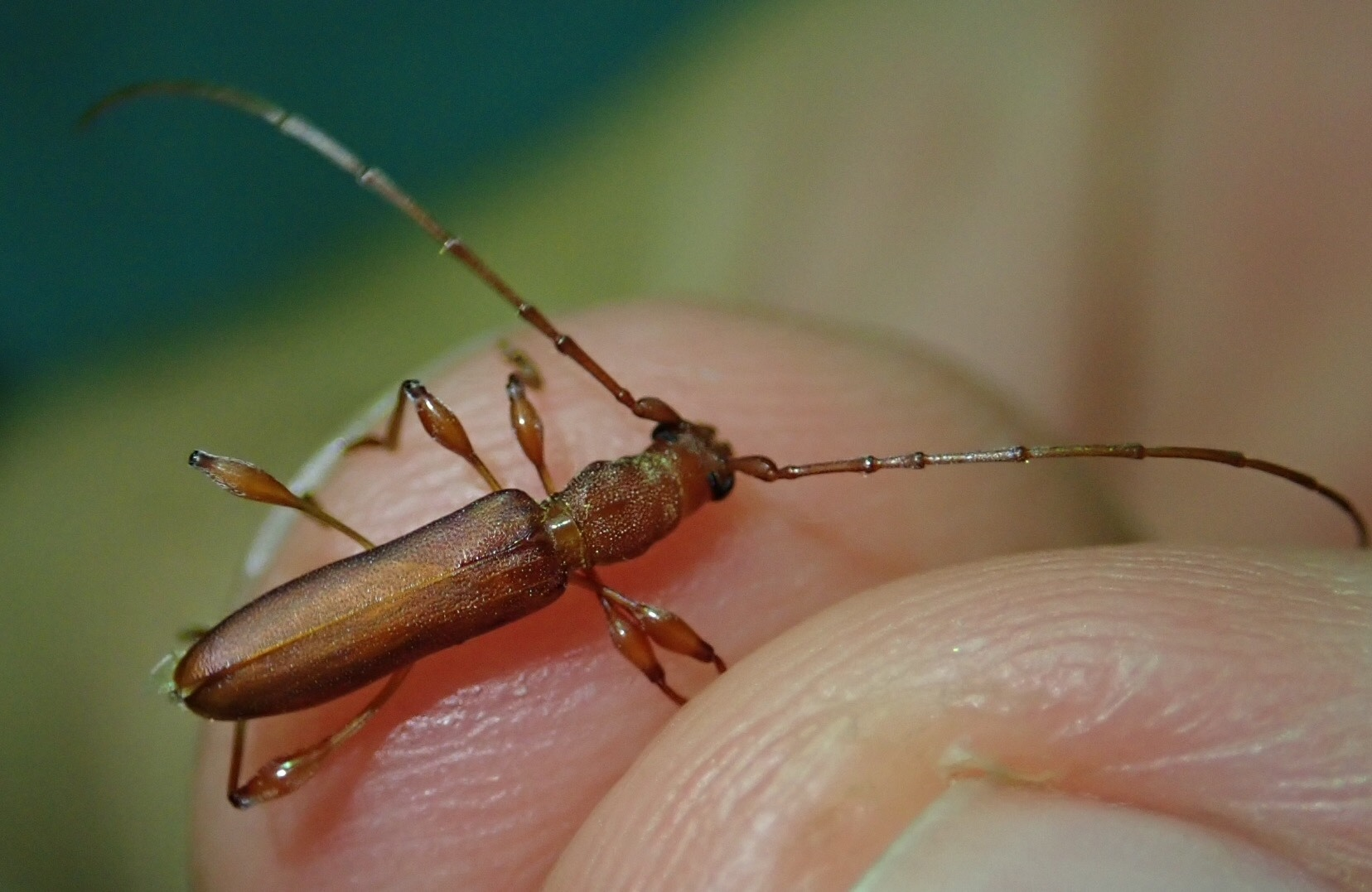
Cordylomera filicornis, Botswana

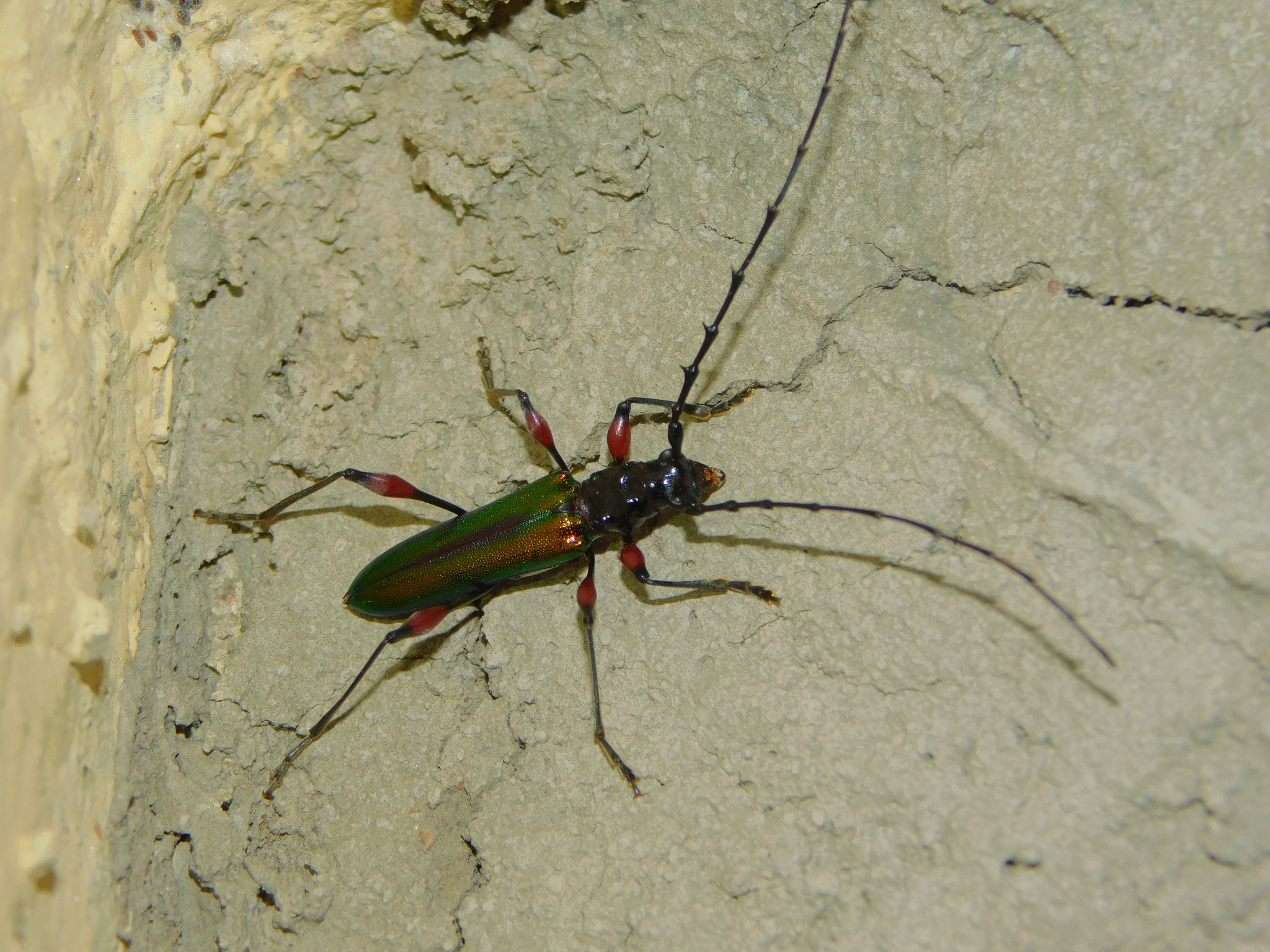
Cordylomera spinicornis, Uganda
