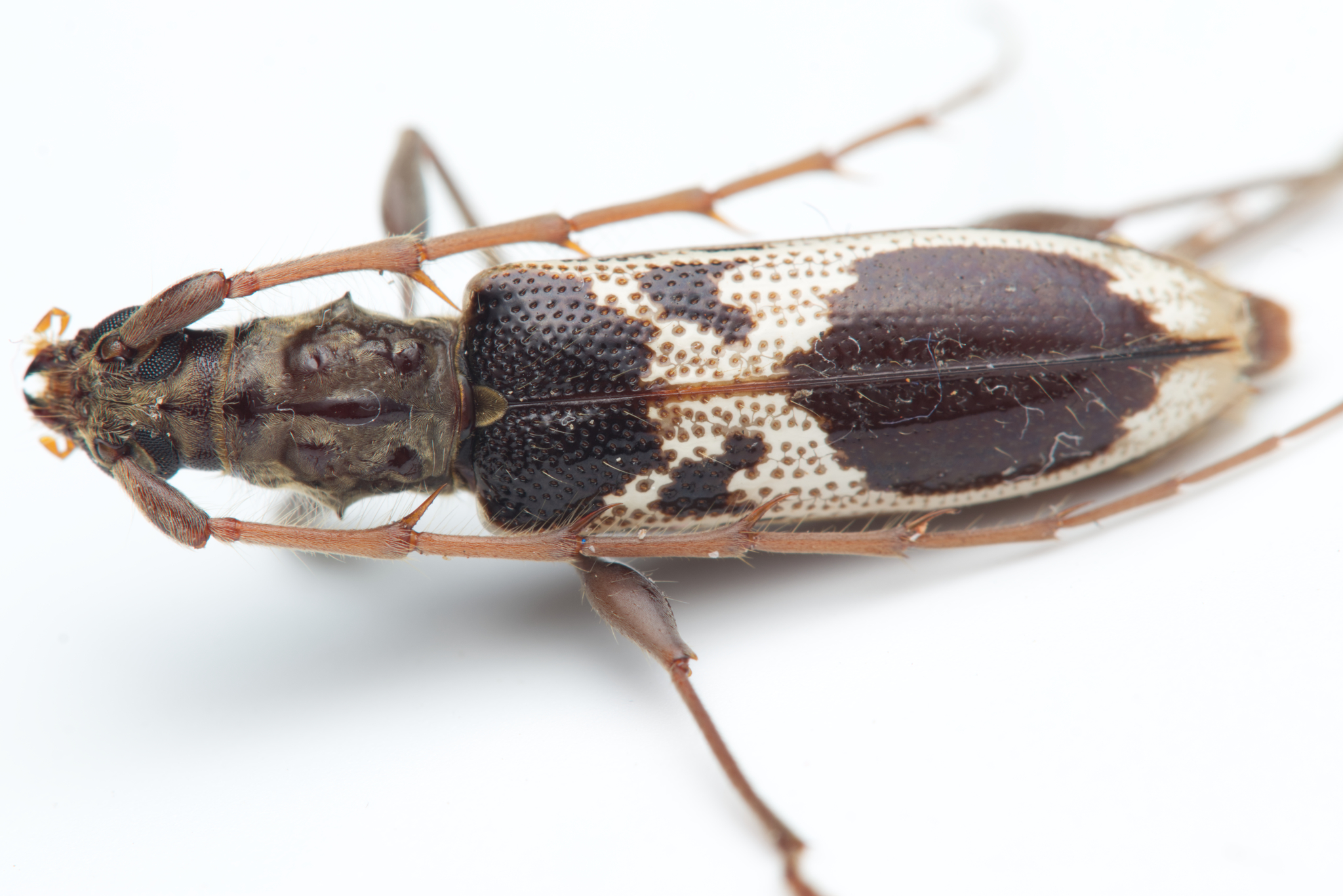

Scientific classification
- Domain: Eukaryota
- Kingdom: Animalia
- Phylum: Arthropoda
- Class: Insecta
- Order: Coleoptera
- Suborder: Polyphaga
- Infraorder: Cucujiformia
- Family: Cerambycidae
- Genus: Coptocercus
- Species: C. crucigerus

Binomial name
- Coptocercus crucigerus (Hope, 1842)

Synonyms
- Stenochorus cruciger Hope, 1842; Phoracantha polita Pascoe, 1863

= Coptocercus crucigerus =

Species of beetle

Coptocercus crucigerus is a species of beetle in the family Cerambycidae (the long-horned beetles), first described by Frederick William Hope in 1842 as Stenochorus cruciger, from a specimen collected in Port Essington (Darwin). In 1929, Herbert James Carter assigned the species to the genus Coptocercus, and also synonymised it with Phoracantha polita Pascoe, 1863.

== Distribution ==
C. crucigerus is native to Australia, occurring in the Northern Territory, Queensland and New South Wales. Wang states that it is found in the Northern Territory, Queensland, Western Australia, and Papua New Guinea.
