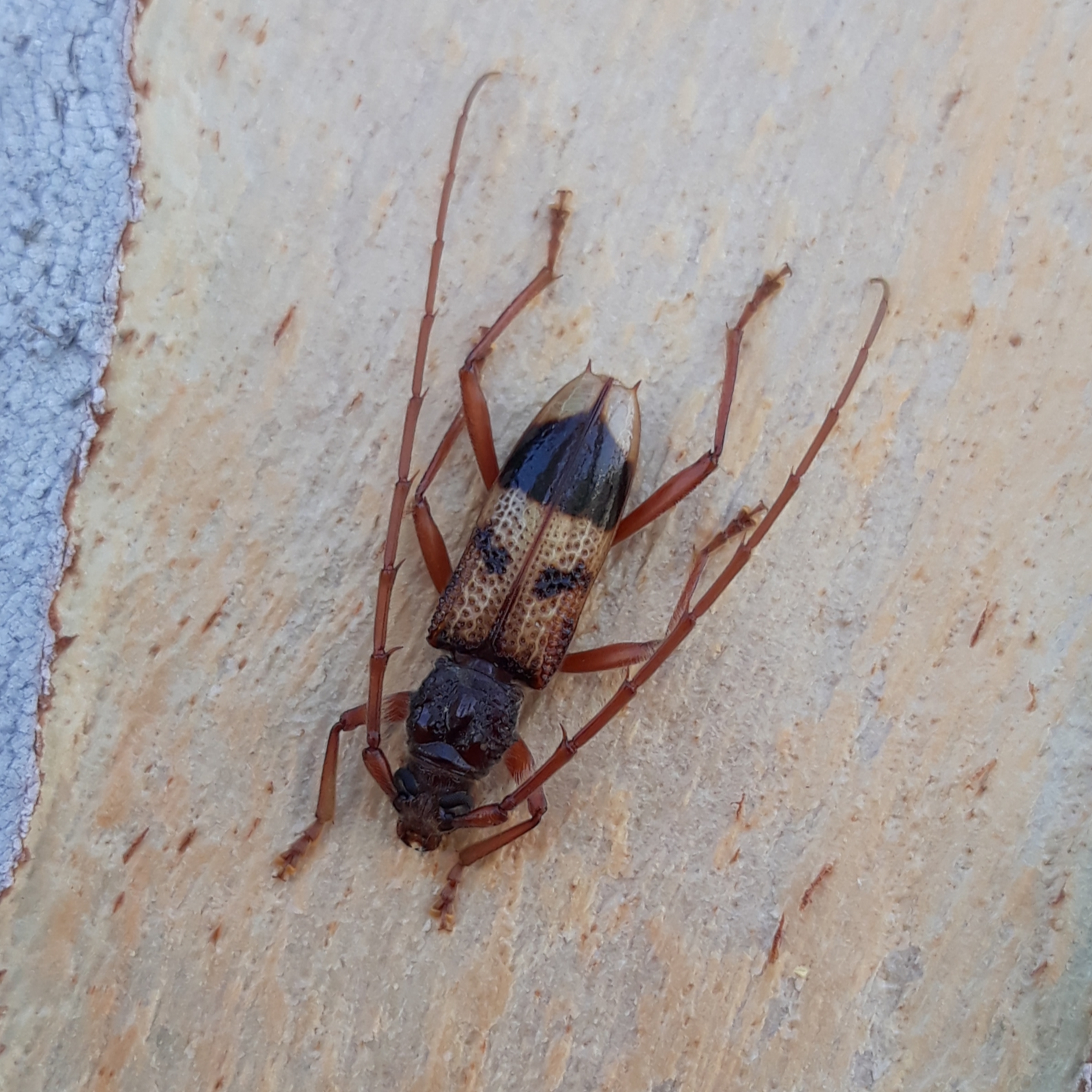

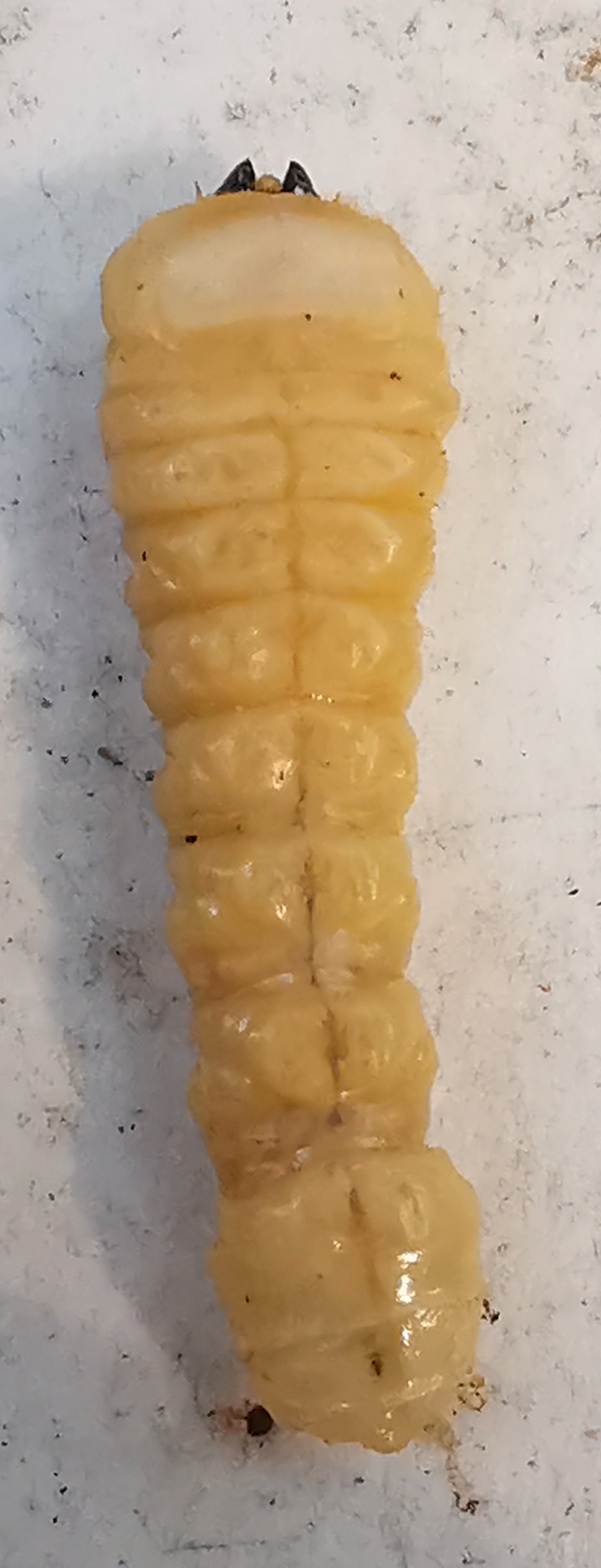

Scientific classification
- Domain: Eukaryota
- Kingdom: Animalia
- Phylum: Arthropoda
- Class: Insecta
- Order: Coleoptera
- Suborder: Polyphaga
- Infraorder: Cucujiformia
- Family: Cerambycidae
- Genus: Phoracantha
- Species: P. recurva

Binomial name
- Phoracantha recurva Newman, 1840

= Phoracantha recurva =

Species of insect

Phoracantha recurva, the lesser Eucalyptus longhorn, is a species of beetle in the family Cerambycidae. It is native to Australia but has been introduced and is now widespread in many countries, including the United States of America. In the early 2000s it was observed in Sardinia, perhaps brought by a ship.

== Description ==
This medium-sized beetle features a complex pattern of cream and brown markings.

It is similar to the related P. semipunctata, but differs in the smaller size and more limited dark markings. Unlike that species the basal portion of the elytra appears dominantly pale, with only a few separated dark spots instead of a series of closer markings.
