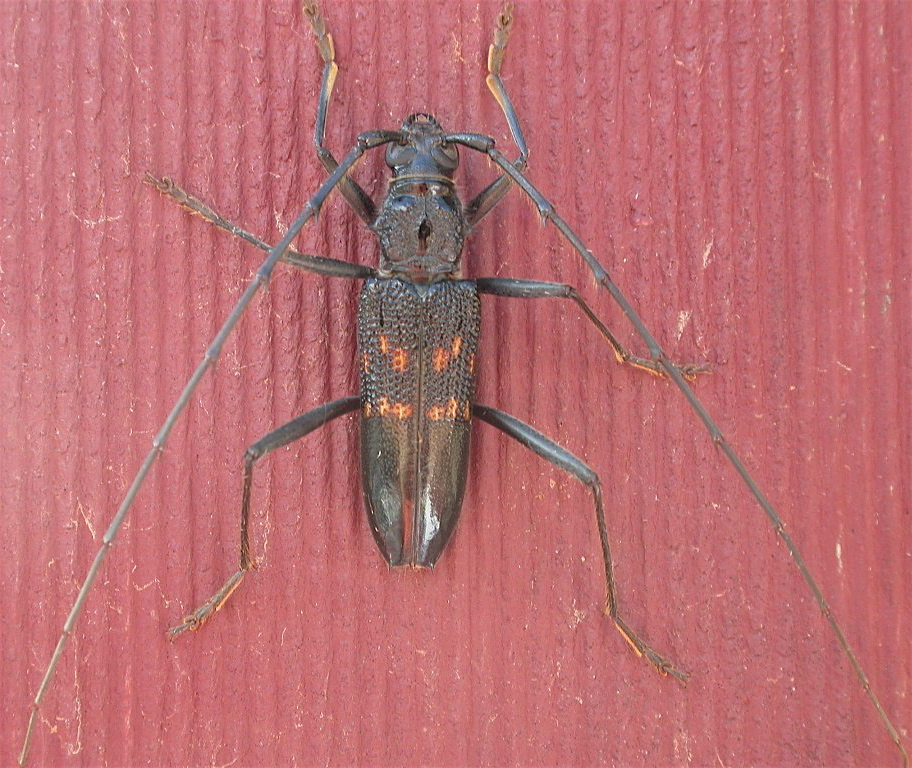

Scientific classification
- Kingdom: Animalia
- Phylum: Arthropoda
- Class: Insecta
- Order: Coleoptera
- Suborder: Polyphaga
- Infraorder: Cucujiformia
- Family: Cerambycidae
- Genus: Phoracantha
- Species: P. obscura

Binomial name
- Phoracantha obscura (Donovan, 1805)

Synonyms
- Stenocorus obscurus Donovan, 1805; Phoracantha posticalis Blackburn, 1894

= Phoracantha obscura =

Species of beetle

Phoracantha obscura is a species of longhorn beetle native to Australia.

== Description ==
Males are between 13 and 28 mm while females are 14 to 29 mm. The head, pronotum and elytra vary from blackish brown to dark reddish brown, and the elytra have two yellow fascia. Antennal segments 3 to 10 have apical spines.
