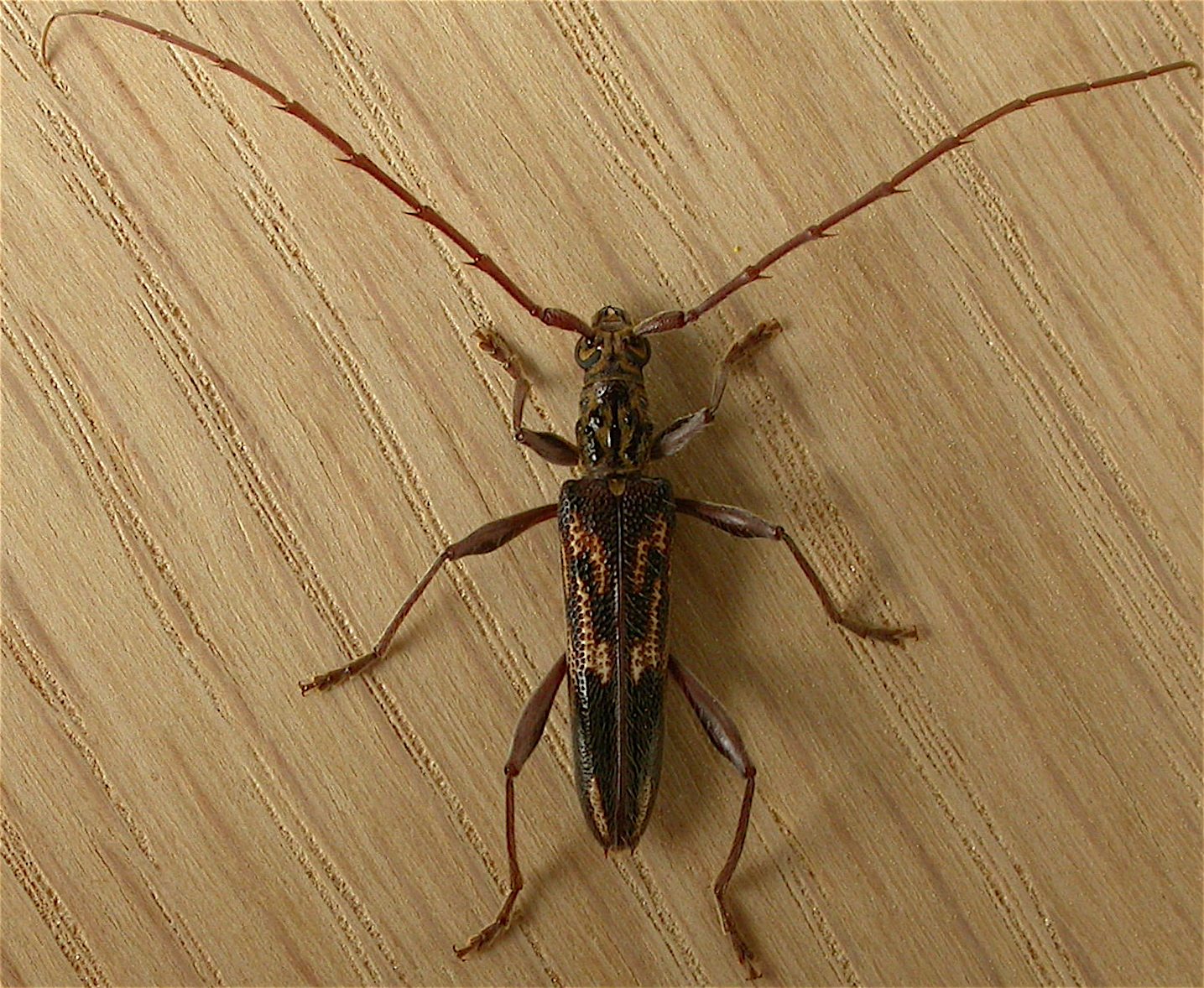

Scientific classification
- Domain: Eukaryota
- Kingdom: Animalia
- Phylum: Arthropoda
- Class: Insecta
- Order: Coleoptera
- Suborder: Polyphaga
- Infraorder: Cucujiformia
- Family: Cerambycidae
- Genus: Coptocercus
- Species: C. rubripes

Binomial name
- Coptocercus rubripes (Boisduval, 1835)

Synonyms
- Stenoderus rubripes Boisduval, 1835; Phoracantha allapsa Newman, E. 1840; Stenochorus roei Hope, F.W. 1841

= Coptocercus rubripes =

Species of beetle

Coptocercus rubripes is a species of beetle in the family Cerambycidae. It occurs in Australia and New Zealand.

Coptocercus rubripes measure 12–28 mm (0.47–1.10 in) in length.
