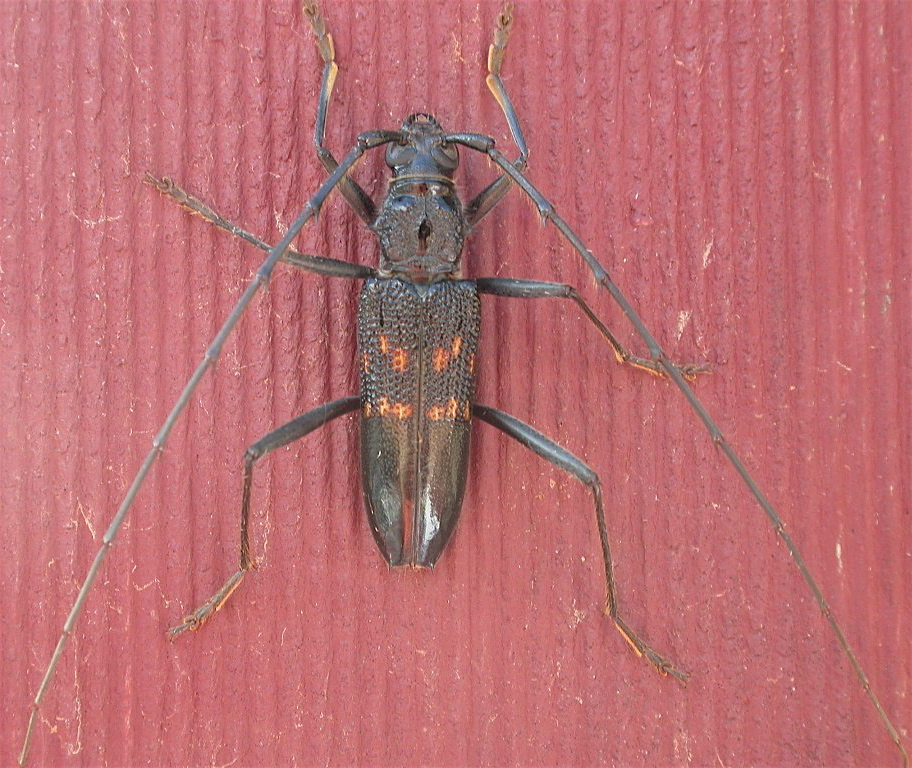
- Phoracantha obscura

Scientific classification
- Kingdom: Animalia
- Phylum: Arthropoda
- Clade: Pancrustacea
- Class: Insecta
- Order: Coleoptera
- Suborder: Polyphaga
- Infraorder: Cucujiformia
- Family: Cerambycidae
- Subfamily: Cerambycinae
- Tribe: Phoracanthini
- Genus: Phoracantha; Newman, 1840

Type species
- Stenocorus semipunctatus Fabricius, 1775

Synonyms
- Diospides Pascoe, 1866; Tryphocharia Pascoe, 1866; Xypeta Pascoe, 1866; Phytrocaria Wang, 1996

= Phoracantha =

Genus of beetles

Phoracantha is a genus of longhorn beetles native to Australia and New Guinea. Species in this genus are primarily associated with Eucalyptus trees, with some species considered economically significant pests.

== Distribution and habitat ==
Phoracantha species are native to Australia and New Guinea, though some species have been introduced to parts of Africa, Europe, North America, and South America. Most Phoracantha species are native to southern Australia, with a smaller proportion of species native to northern Australia and/or New Guinea. The genus is represented in every Australian state and is mostly distributed along the coast, with only one species, P. tuberalis, restricted to central Australia.

== Species ==
This genus includes the following species:

- Phoracantha acanthocera (Macleay, 1826)
- Phoracantha alternata Carter, 1929
- Phoracantha ancoralis Wang, 1995
- Phoracantha complicata Wang, 1995
- Phoracantha concolor Carter, 1929
- Phoracantha cruciata Wang, 1995
- Phoracantha elegans Blackburn, 1894
- Phoracantha flavopicta Pascoe, 1865
- Phoracantha frenchi (Blackburn, 1892)
- Phoracantha grallaria Pascoe, 1864
- Phoracantha guttata (Blackburn, 1892)
- Phoracantha immaculata (Carter, 1929)
- Phoracantha impavida Newman, 1850
- Phoracantha laetabilis Blackburn, 1894
- Phoracantha lata (Hope, 1841)
- Phoracantha longipennis (Hope, 1841)
- Phoracantha manifesta Wang, 1995
- Phoracantha mastersi (Pascoe, 1875)
- Phoracantha mitchelli (Hope, 1841)
- Phoracantha multiformis Wang, 1995
- Phoracantha niamata Wang, 1995
- Phoracantha northamensis (McKeown, 1948)
- Phoracantha obscura (Donovan, 1805)
- Phoracantha odewahnii Pascoe, 1864
- Phoracantha perbella Wang, 1995
- Phoracantha phaea (Wang, 1996)
- Phoracantha placenta (Carter, 1929)
- Phoracantha porosa Carter, 1929
- Phoracantha princeps (Blackburn, 1889)
- Phoracantha punctata (Donovan, 1805)
- Phoracantha punctipennis (Blackburn, 1889)
- Phoracantha recurva Newman, 1840
- Phoracantha rugithoracica Wang, 1995
- Phoracantha saviesi Fauvel, 1906
- Phoracantha semipunctata (Fabricius, 1775)
- Phoracantha solida (Blackburn, 1894)
- Phoracantha superans Pascoe, 1862
- Phoracantha synonyma Newman, 1840
- Phoracantha tricuspis Newman, 1840
- Phoracantha tuberalis Wang, 1995
- Phoracantha tunicatus (Macleay, 1826)
