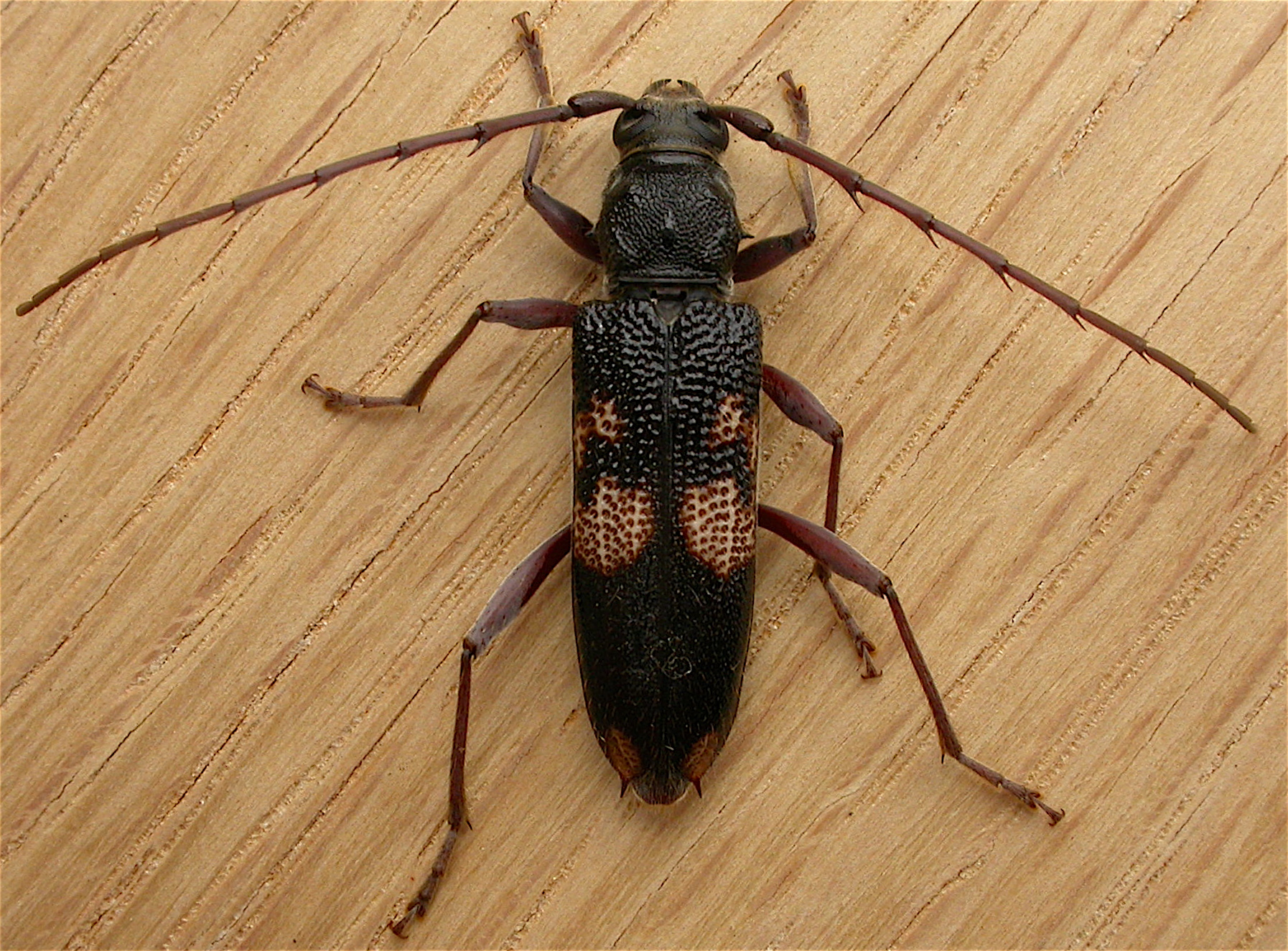

Scientific classification
- Kingdom: Animalia
- Phylum: Arthropoda
- Class: Insecta
- Order: Coleoptera
- Suborder: Polyphaga
- Infraorder: Cucujiformia
- Family: Cerambycidae
- Genus: Phoracantha
- Species: P. punctata

Binomial name
- Phoracantha punctata (Donovan, 1805)

Synonyms
- Stenocorus punctatus Donovan, 1805; Phoracantha quinaria Newman, 1840; Phoracantha fallax Pascoe, 1863

= Phoracantha punctata =

Species of beetle

Phoracantha punctata is a species of Cerambycinae that is native to Australia.

== Description ==
Males are between 12 and 26mm while females are 14 to 27mm long. They are dark reddish-brown to blackish-brown, the elytra has additional pale markings.
