= Paratessaropa =

Paratessaropa brachyptera

Scientific classification
- Kingdom: Animalia
- Phylum: Arthropoda
- Class: Insecta
- Order: Coleoptera
- Suborder: Polyphaga
- Infraorder: Cucujiformia
- Family: Cerambycidae
- Genus: Paratessaropa
- Species: P. brachyptera

Binomial name
- Paratessaropa brachyptera Zajciw, 1957

Genus of beetles

Paratessaropa brachyptera is a species of beetle in the family Cerambycidae, the only species in the genus Paratessaropa.
