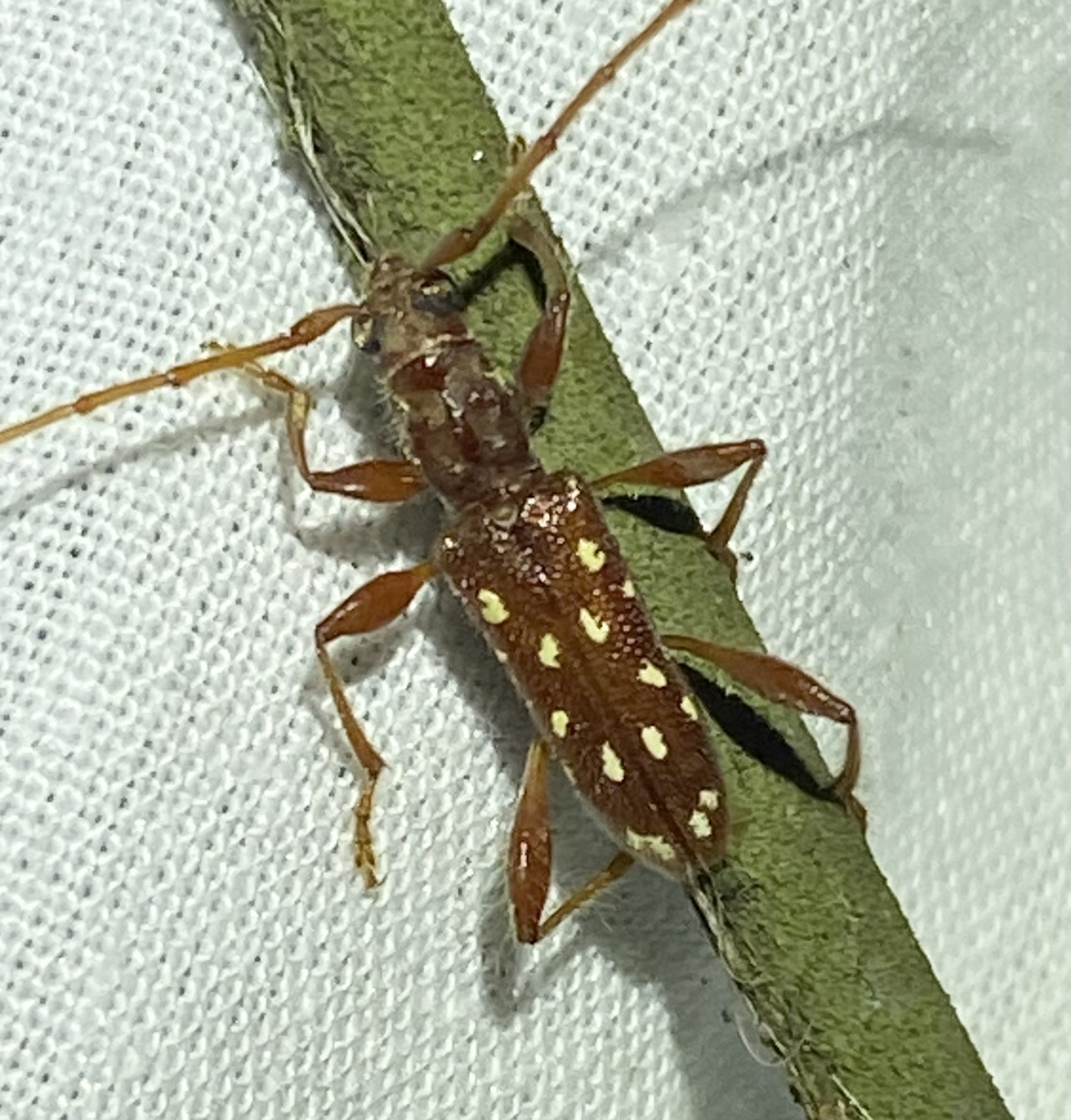
- Thoris octoguttata, Australia

Scientific classification
- Domain: Eukaryota
- Kingdom: Animalia
- Phylum: Arthropoda
- Class: Insecta
- Order: Coleoptera
- Suborder: Polyphaga
- Infraorder: Cucujiformia
- Family: Cerambycidae
- Subfamily: Cerambycinae
- Tribe: Phoracanthini
- Genus: Thoris; Pascoe, 1867

= Thoris =

Genus of beetles

Thoris is a genus of longhorned beetles in the family Cerambycidae. There are about eight described species in Thoris.

== Species ==
These eight species belong to the genus Thoris:

- Thoris acuta Gressitt, 1959 (Papua New Guinea)
- Thoris brandti W. Wang, 1994 (Papua New Guinea)
- Thoris eburifera Pascoe, 1867 (Australia)
- Thoris gilesi Gressitt, 1959 (Papua New Guinea)
- Thoris octoguttata W. Wang, 1994 (Australia)
- Thoris quinqueguttata Gressitt, 1959 (Papua New Guinea)
- Thoris septemguttata Blackburn, 1900 (Australia)
- Thoris sexguttata Carter, 1929 (Australia)
