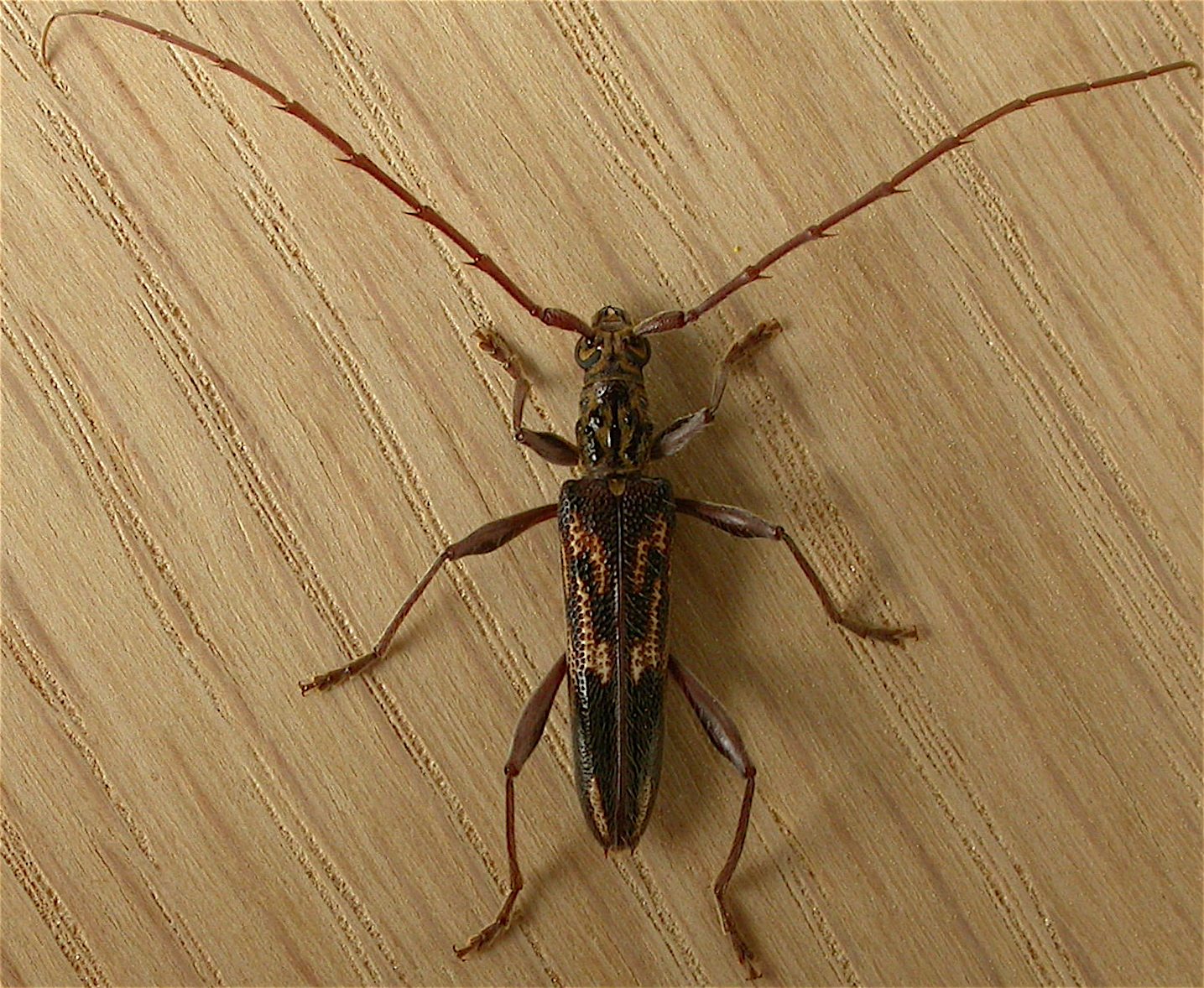
- Coptocercus rubripes

Scientific classification
- Kingdom: Animalia
- Phylum: Arthropoda
- Clade: Pancrustacea
- Class: Insecta
- Order: Coleoptera
- Suborder: Polyphaga
- Infraorder: Cucujiformia
- Family: Cerambycidae
- Genus: Coptocercus; Hope, 1841

= Coptocercus =

Genus of beetles

Coptocercus is a genus of beetles in the family Cerambycidae, mainly found in Eucalypts.

== Species ==
The following species are accepted within Coptocercus:

- Coptocercus abberrans (Newman, 1840)
- Coptocercus aruensis Wang, 1995
- Coptocercus assimilis (Hope, 1841)
- Coptocercus australis Wang, 1995
- Coptocercus biguttatus (Donovan, 1805)
- Coptocercus clarus Wang, 1995
- Coptocercus crucigerus (Hope, 1842)
- Coptocercus galachrous Wang, 1995
- Coptocercus javanicus Wang, 1995
- Coptocercus matthewsi Wang, 1995
- Coptocercus multitrichus Wang, 1995
- Coptocercus mutabilis Gressitt, 1959
- Coptocercus nigritulus Blackburn, 1889
- Coptocercus orientalis Wang, 1995
- Coptocercus ovaliguttatus Wang, 1995
- Coptocercus papuanus Heller, 1914
- Coptocercus pascoei Wang, 1995
- Coptocercus pedator (Pascoe, 1864)
- Coptocercus pretiosus Wang, 1995
- Coptocercus pubescens (Pascoe, 1863)
- Coptocercus quatuordecimsignatus Schwarzer, 1926
- Coptocercus robustus Wang, 1995
- Coptocercus rotundiguttatus Wang, 1995
- Coptocercus rubripes (Boisduval, 1835)
- Coptocercus rugicollis Aurivillius, 1917
- Coptocercus schneiderae Wang, 1995
- Coptocercus scripticollis Carter, 1930
- Coptocercus shuteae Wang, 1995
- Coptocercus spinithoracicus Wang, 1995
- Coptocercus sulciscapus Wang, 1995
- Coptocercus terminalis Wang, 1995
- Coptocercus tricolor Wang, 1995
- Coptocercus trimaculatus (Hope, 1841)
- Coptocercus truncatus Aurivillius, 1917
- Coptocercus undulatus (Hope, 1841)
- Coptocercus validus Gahan, 1893
- Coptocercus vicinus (Hope, 1842)
- Coptocercus walkeri Wang, 1995
- Coptocercus weiri Wang, 1995
