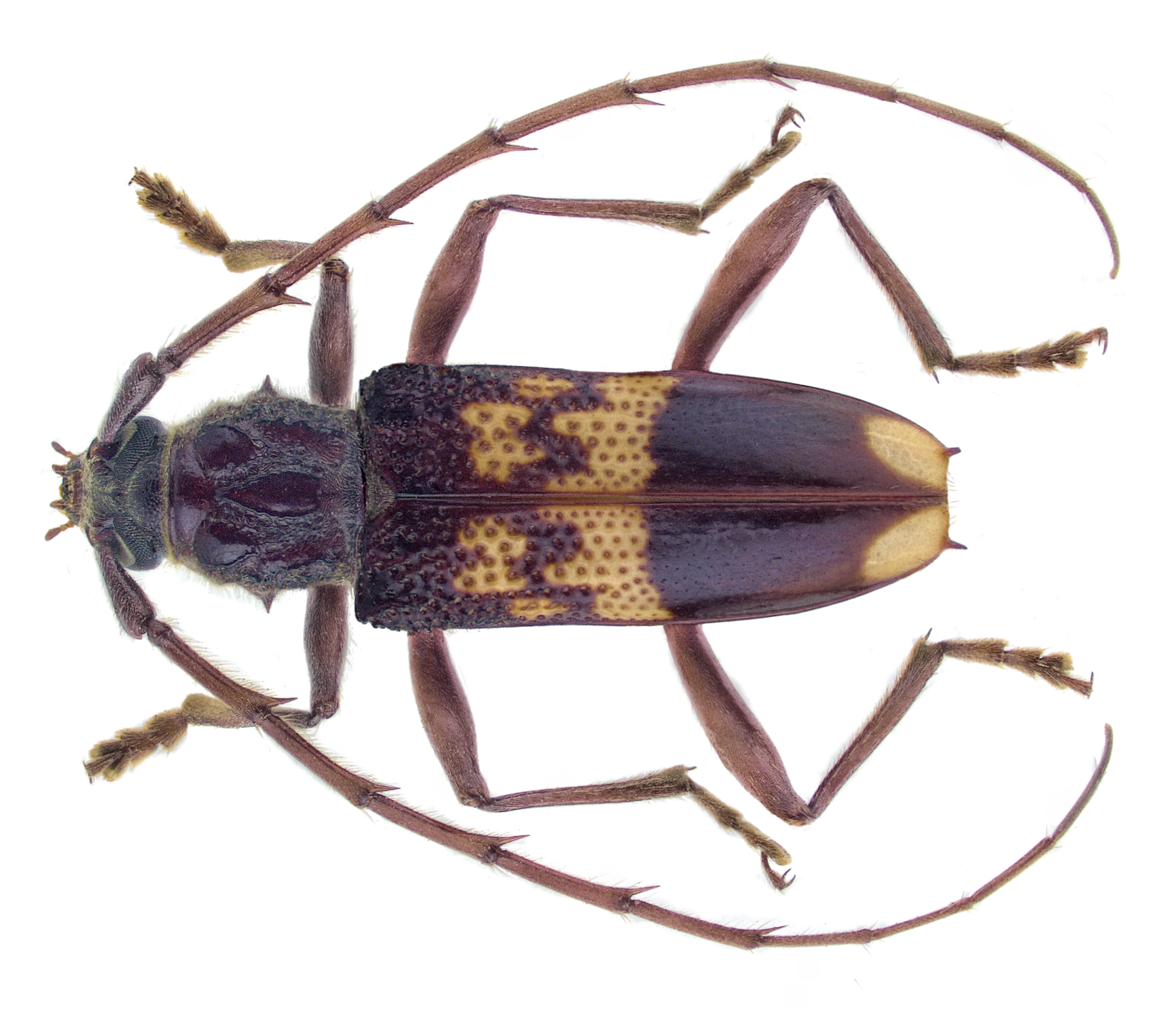
- Phoracantha semipunctata

Scientific classification
- Domain: Eukaryota
- Kingdom: Animalia
- Phylum: Arthropoda
- Class: Insecta
- Order: Coleoptera
- Suborder: Polyphaga
- Infraorder: Cucujiformia
- Family: Cerambycidae
- Subfamily: Cerambycinae
- Tribe: Phoracanthini; Lacordaire, 1869

= Phoracanthini =

Tribe of beetles

Phoracanthini is a tribe of beetles in the subfamily Cerambycinae.

== Genera ==
The following genera are recognised in the tribe Phoracanthini:

- Coptocercus
- Allotisis
- Thoris
- Epithora
- Skeletodes
- Atesta
- Paratesta
- Steata
- Coleocoptus
- Phytrocaria
- Phoracantha
- Semiphoracantha
