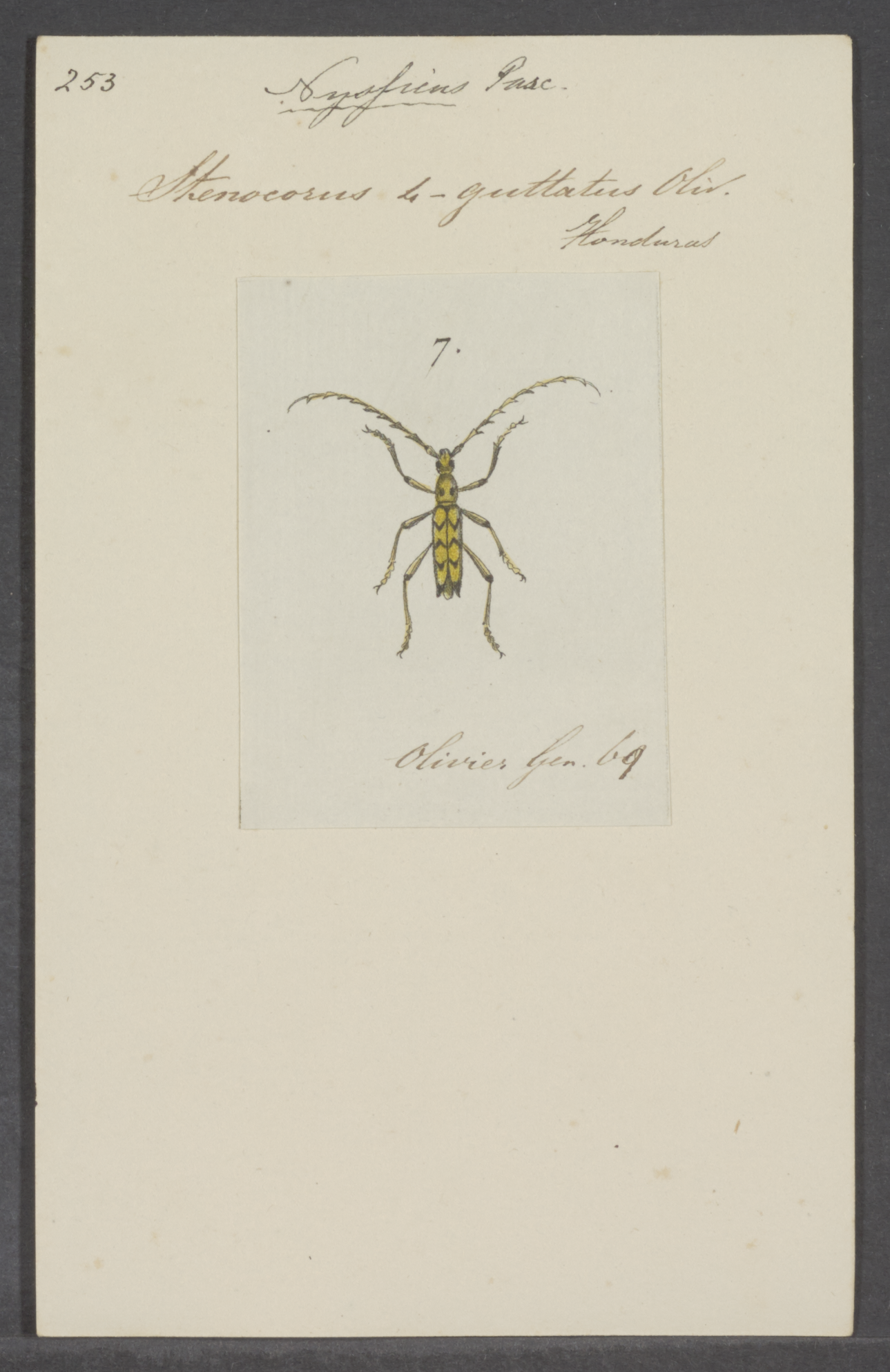

Scientific classification
- Kingdom: Animalia
- Phylum: Arthropoda
- Clade: Pancrustacea
- Class: Insecta
- Order: Coleoptera
- Suborder: Polyphaga
- Infraorder: Cucujiformia
- Family: Cerambycidae
- Genus: Nyssicus
- Species: N. quadriguttatus

Binomial name
- Nyssicus quadriguttatus (Swederus, 1787)

= Nyssicus quadriguttatus =

Species of beetle

Nyssicus quadriguttatus is a species of beetle in the family Cerambycidae. It was described by Swederus in 1787.

This species is endemic to Central America and northern South America, specifically Bolivia, Brazil, Ecuador, Guyana, Honduras, and Venezuela.
