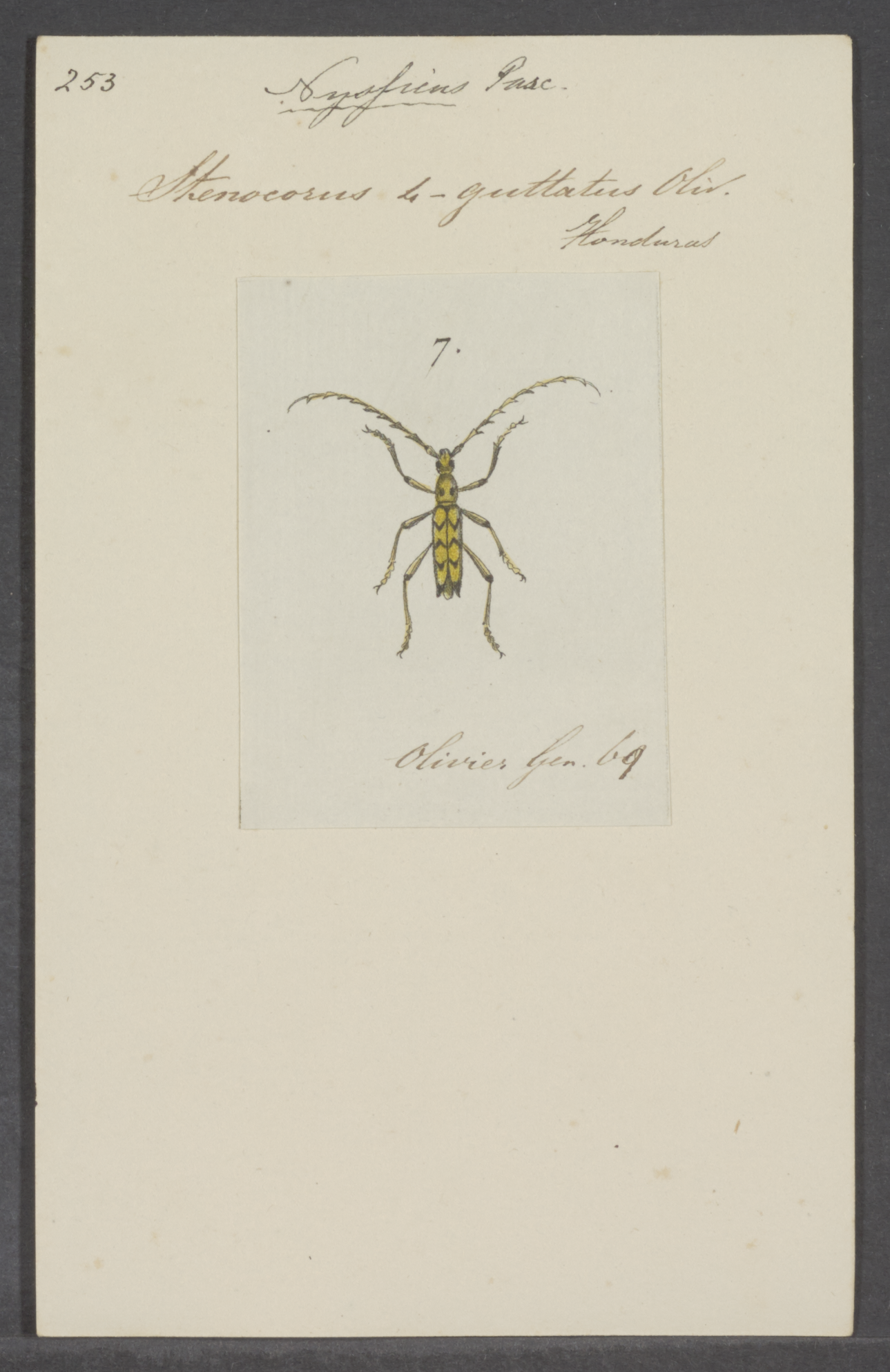

Scientific classification
- Kingdom: Animalia
- Phylum: Arthropoda
- Class: Insecta
- Order: Coleoptera
- Suborder: Polyphaga
- Infraorder: Cucujiformia
- Family: Cerambycidae
- Subfamily: Cerambycinae
- Tribe: Elaphidiini
- Genus: Nyssicus; Pascoe, 1859

= Nyssicus =

Genus of beetles

Nyssicus is a genus of beetles in the family Cerambycidae, containing the following species:

- Nyssicus contaminatus Martins, 2005
- Nyssicus fernandezi Joly & Martinez, 1981
- Nyssicus mendosus Martins, 2005
- Nyssicus quadriguttatus (Swederus, 1787)
- Nyssicus rosalesi Joly & Martinez, 1981
- Nyssicus topographicus Linsley, 1935
