= Nyssicus rosalesi =

Scientific classification
- Kingdom: Animalia
- Phylum: Arthropoda
- Class: Insecta
- Order: Coleoptera
- Suborder: Polyphaga
- Infraorder: Cucujiformia
- Family: Cerambycidae
- Genus: Nyssicus
- Species: N. rosalesi

Binomial name
- Nyssicus rosalesi Joly & Martinez, 1981

Species of beetle

Nyssicus rosalesi is a species of beetle in the family Cerambycidae. It was described by Joly and Martinez in 1981.
