= Nyssicus mendosus =

Scientific classification
- Kingdom: Animalia
- Phylum: Arthropoda
- Class: Insecta
- Order: Coleoptera
- Suborder: Polyphaga
- Infraorder: Cucujiformia
- Family: Cerambycidae
- Genus: Nyssicus
- Species: N. mendosus

Binomial name
- Nyssicus mendosus Martins, 2005

Species of beetle

Nyssicus mendosus is a species of beetle in the family Cerambycidae. It was described by Martins in 2005.
