= Parelaphidion incertum =

Scientific classification
- Kingdom: Animalia
- Phylum: Arthropoda
- Class: Insecta
- Order: Coleoptera
- Suborder: Polyphaga
- Infraorder: Cucujiformia
- Family: Cerambycidae
- Genus: Parelaphidion
- Species: P. incertum

Binomial name
- Parelaphidion incertum (Newman, 1840)

Species of beetle

Parelaphidion incertum is a species of beetle in the family Cerambycidae. It was described by Newman in 1840.
