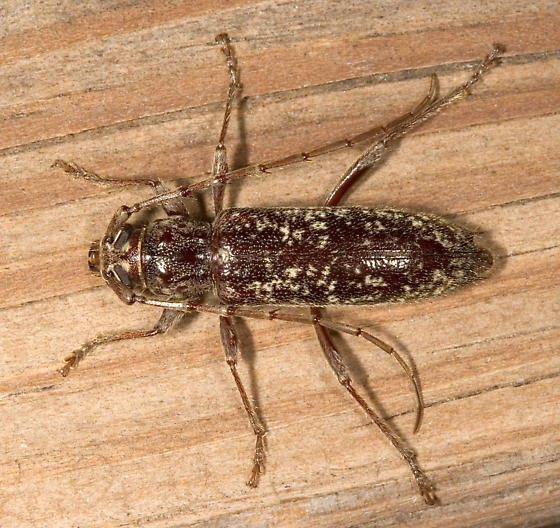

Scientific classification
- Kingdom: Animalia
- Phylum: Arthropoda
- Class: Insecta
- Order: Coleoptera
- Suborder: Polyphaga
- Infraorder: Cucujiformia
- Family: Cerambycidae
- Genus: Parelaphidion
- Species: P. aspersum

Binomial name
- Parelaphidion aspersum (Haldeman, 1847)

= Parelaphidion aspersum =

Species of beetle

Parelaphidion aspersum is a species of beetle in the family Cerambycidae. It was described by Haldeman in 1847.
