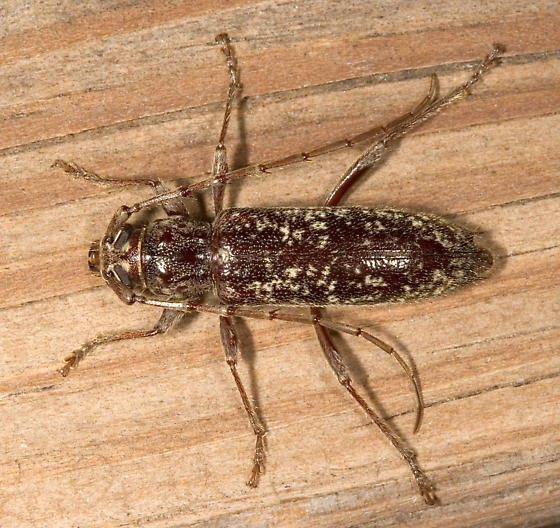
- Parelaphidion aspersum

Scientific classification
- Kingdom: Animalia
- Phylum: Arthropoda
- Class: Insecta
- Order: Coleoptera
- Suborder: Polyphaga
- Infraorder: Cucujiformia
- Family: Cerambycidae
- Tribe: Elaphidiini
- Genus: Parelaphidion

= Parelaphidion =

Genus of beetles

Parelaphidion is a genus of beetles in the family Cerambycidae, of the subfamily Cerambycinae and tribe Elaphidiini, containing the following species:

- Parelaphidion aspersum (Haldeman, 1847)
- Parelaphidion incertum (Newman, 1840)
