= Dichophyiini =

Scientific classification
- Kingdom: Animalia
- Phylum: Arthropoda
- Class: Insecta
- Order: Coleoptera
- Suborder: Polyphaga
- Infraorder: Cucujiformia
- Family: Cerambycidae
- Subfamily: Cerambycinae
- Tribe: Dichophyiini; Gistel, 1848

Tribe of beetles

Dichophyiini is a tribe of beetles in the subfamily Cerambycinae, containing the following genera:

- Allodemus Zajciw, 1962
- Alloesia Chevrolat, 1862
- Amoaba Napp & Martins, 2006
- Aridaeus Thomson, 1860
- Callideriphus Blanchard in Gay, 1851
- Championa Bates, 1880
- Chrysoprasis Audinet-Serville, 1834
- Cremys Pascoe, 1867
- Eriphosoma Melzer, 1922
- Eryphus Perty, 1832
- Erythrochiton Zajciw, 1957
- Erythropterus Melzer, 1934
- Eupempelus Bates, 1870
- Homogenes Thomson in Chevrolat, 1862
- Mallosoma Audinet-Serville, 1834
- Monnecles Napp & Santos, 1999
- Neopoeciloderma Monné & Martins, 1981
- Plectrocerum Dejean, 1835
- Poeciloderma White, 1853
- Potisangaba Napp & Martins, 2009
- Pseudothonalmus Guerrero, 2004
- Purpuricenopsis Zajciw, 1968
- Stratone Thomson, 1864
- Tacyba Napp & Martins, 2002
- Tobipuranga Napp & Martins, 1996
- Trichrous Chevrolat, 1858
- Unabiara Napp & Martins, 2002
- Unatara Martins & Napp, 2007
