= Eryphus tacuarembo =

Scientific classification
- Kingdom: Animalia
- Phylum: Arthropoda
- Class: Insecta
- Order: Coleoptera
- Suborder: Polyphaga
- Infraorder: Cucujiformia
- Family: Cerambycidae
- Genus: Eryphus
- Species: E. tacuarembo

Binomial name
- Eryphus tacuarembo Napp & Martins, 2002

Species of beetle

Eryphus tacuarembo is a species of beetle in the family Cerambycidae.
