= Chrysoprasis bipartita =

Scientific classification
- Kingdom: Animalia
- Phylum: Arthropoda
- Class: Insecta
- Order: Coleoptera
- Suborder: Polyphaga
- Infraorder: Cucujiformia
- Family: Cerambycidae
- Genus: Chrysoprasis
- Species: C. bipartita

Binomial name
- Chrysoprasis bipartita Zajciw, 1963

Species of beetle

Chrysoprasis bipartita is a species of beetle in the family Cerambycidae. It was described by Zajciw in 1963.
