= Eriphosoma =

Scientific classification
- Kingdom: Animalia
- Phylum: Arthropoda
- Class: Insecta
- Order: Coleoptera
- Suborder: Polyphaga
- Infraorder: Cucujiformia
- Family: Cerambycidae
- Subfamily: Cerambycinae
- Tribe: Dichophyiini
- Genus: Eriphosoma; Melzer, 1922

Genus of beetles

Eriphosoma is a genus of beetles in the family Cerambycidae, containing the following species:

- Eriphosoma barbiellinii Melzer, 1922
- Eriphosoma bipartitum (Buquet in Guérin-Méneville, 1844)
- Eriphosoma jacobi Fuchs, 1961
- Eriphosoma marcela Napp & Monne, 2006
- Eriphosoma mermudes Napp & Monne, 2006
