= Eriphosoma mermudes =

Scientific classification
- Kingdom: Animalia
- Phylum: Arthropoda
- Class: Insecta
- Order: Coleoptera
- Suborder: Polyphaga
- Infraorder: Cucujiformia
- Family: Cerambycidae
- Genus: Eriphosoma
- Species: E. mermudes

Binomial name
- Eriphosoma mermudes Napp & Monne, 2006

Species of beetle

Eriphosoma mermudes is a species of beetle in the family Cerambycidae. It was described by Napp and Monne in 2006.
