= Chrysoprasis aurigena =

Scientific classification
- Kingdom: Animalia
- Phylum: Arthropoda
- Clade: Pancrustacea
- Class: Insecta
- Order: Coleoptera
- Suborder: Polyphaga
- Infraorder: Cucujiformia
- Family: Cerambycidae
- Genus: Chrysoprasis
- Species: C. aurigena

Binomial name
- Chrysoprasis aurigena (Germar, 1824)

Species of beetle

Chrysoprasis aurigena is a species of beetle in the family Cerambycidae. It was described by Ernst Friedrich Germar in 1824. It is found in Brazil (Mato Grosso, Goiás, Mato Grosso do Sul, Maranhão, Rio Grande do Norte, Paraíba, Pernambuco, Ceará, Bahia, Minas Gerais, Espírito Santo, Rio de Janeiro, São Paulo, Paraná, Santa Catarina, Rio Grande do Sul), Paraguay, Bolivia (Santa Cruz, Tarija), Argentina (Corrientes, Misiones, Jujuy, Salta, Santiago del Estero, Tucumán, Córdoba, Santa Fé) and Uruguay.
