= Championa badeni =

Scientific classification
- Kingdom: Animalia
- Phylum: Arthropoda
- Clade: Pancrustacea
- Class: Insecta
- Order: Coleoptera
- Suborder: Polyphaga
- Infraorder: Cucujiformia
- Family: Cerambycidae
- Genus: Championa
- Species: C. badeni

Binomial name
- Championa badeni Bates, 1892

Species of beetle

Championa badeni is a species of beetle in the family Cerambycidae. It was described by Bates in 1892.
