= Erythropterus urucuri =

Scientific classification
- Kingdom: Animalia
- Phylum: Arthropoda
- Class: Insecta
- Order: Coleoptera
- Suborder: Polyphaga
- Infraorder: Cucujiformia
- Family: Cerambycidae
- Genus: Erythropterus
- Species: E. urucuri

Binomial name
- Erythropterus urucuri Martins & Galileo, 2004

Species of beetle

Erythropterus urucuri is a species of beetle in the family Cerambycidae. It was described by Martins and Galileo in 2004.
