= Mallosoma scutellare =

Scientific classification
- Kingdom: Animalia
- Phylum: Arthropoda
- Class: Insecta
- Order: Coleoptera
- Suborder: Polyphaga
- Infraorder: Cucujiformia
- Family: Cerambycidae
- Genus: Mallosoma
- Species: M. scutellare

Binomial name
- Mallosoma scutellare White, 1853

Species of beetle

Mallosoma scutellare is a species of beetle in the family Cerambycidae. It was described by White in 1853.
