= Eriphosoma barbiellinii =

Scientific classification
- Kingdom: Animalia
- Phylum: Arthropoda
- Clade: Pancrustacea
- Class: Insecta
- Order: Coleoptera
- Suborder: Polyphaga
- Infraorder: Cucujiformia
- Family: Cerambycidae
- Genus: Eriphosoma
- Species: E. barbiellinii

Binomial name
- Eriphosoma barbiellinii Melzer, 1922

Species of beetle

Eriphosoma barbiellinii is a species of beetle in the family Cerambycidae. It was described by Melser in 1922.
