= Callideriphus grossipes =

Scientific classification
- Kingdom: Animalia
- Phylum: Arthropoda
- Class: Insecta
- Order: Coleoptera
- Suborder: Polyphaga
- Infraorder: Cucujiformia
- Family: Cerambycidae
- Genus: Callideriphus
- Species: C. grossipes

Binomial name
- Callideriphus grossipes Blanchard in Gay, 1851

Species of beetle

Callideriphus grossipes is a species of beetle in the family Cerambycidae. It was described by Blanchard in 1851.
