= Chrysoprasis gracilis =

Scientific classification
- Kingdom: Animalia
- Phylum: Arthropoda
- Clade: Pancrustacea
- Class: Insecta
- Order: Coleoptera
- Suborder: Polyphaga
- Infraorder: Cucujiformia
- Family: Cerambycidae
- Genus: Chrysoprasis
- Species: C. gracilis

Binomial name
- Chrysoprasis gracilis Vlasak & Santos-Silva, 2026

Species of beetle

Chrysoprasis gracilis is a species of beetle of the family Cerambycidae. It is found in Ecuador.

== Description ==
Adults reach a length of about 7.45–7.8 mm (0.293–0.307 in). The integument is mostly light green metallic, but darker on some areas depending on intensity and angle of light. The incidence is slightly bluish or greenish blue on some areas. The anterior region of the postclypeus, anteclypeus, and most of the labrum are dark brown with slightly violaceous reflections. The mentum is metallic dark green and the remaining surface of the ventral mouthparts is orangish brown with irregular dark brown areas, except for the dark brown palpomeres with an orangish-brown apex. The scape is metallic dark green, with the outer apex blackish violaceous. The pedicel and antennomeres are blackish violaceous. The elytra are, depending on the light angle, entirely light green metallic or dark green metallic with violaceous reflections close to the suture and epipleural margin. The femora are metallic dark green, but slightly darker on the metafemora and the tibiae are metallic dark green about the basal half, darker, with violaceous reflections on the remaining surface. The tarsi are blackish with violaceous reflections. The abdominal ventrites are orangish, becoming gradually lighter toward ventrite 5.

== Etymology ==
The species name is derived from the Latin gracilis (meaning slender) and refers to the relatively slender body shape and small size of the species.
