= Chrysoprasis nymphula =

Scientific classification
- Kingdom: Animalia
- Phylum: Arthropoda
- Clade: Pancrustacea
- Class: Insecta
- Order: Coleoptera
- Suborder: Polyphaga
- Infraorder: Cucujiformia
- Family: Cerambycidae
- Genus: Chrysoprasis
- Species: C. nymphula

Binomial name
- Chrysoprasis nymphula Bates, 1870

Species of beetle

Chrysoprasis nymphula is a species of beetle in the family Cerambycidae (longhorn beetles). It was described by Henry Walter Bates in 1870. It is found in Brazil (Piauí, Ceará, Bahia, Minas Gerais, Espírito Santo, Rio de Janeiro, Paraná, Santa Catarina, and Rio Grande do Sul), Argentina (Misiones) and Uruguay.
