= Chrysoprasis festiva =

Scientific classification
- Kingdom: Animalia
- Phylum: Arthropoda
- Clade: Pancrustacea
- Class: Insecta
- Order: Coleoptera
- Suborder: Polyphaga
- Infraorder: Cucujiformia
- Family: Cerambycidae
- Genus: Chrysoprasis
- Species: C. festiva

Binomial name
- Chrysoprasis festiva Audinet-Serville, 1834

Species of beetle

Chrysoprasis festiva is a species of beetle in the family Cerambycidae. It was described by Audinet-Serville in 1834. It is found in Costa Rica, Panama, Ecuador, Venezuela, French Guiana, Bolivia, and Brazil (Amazonas, Pará, Mato Grosso, Mato Grosso do Sul, Goiás, Bahia, Minas Gerais, Espírito Santo, Rio de Janeiro, São Paulo, Paraná, and Santa Catarina).
