= Eryphus transversalis =

Scientific classification
- Kingdom: Animalia
- Phylum: Arthropoda
- Class: Insecta
- Order: Coleoptera
- Suborder: Polyphaga
- Infraorder: Cucujiformia
- Family: Cerambycidae
- Genus: Eryphus
- Species: E. transversalis

Binomial name
- Eryphus transversalis (Fairmaire & Germain, 1864)

Species of beetle

Eryphus transversalis is a species of beetle in the family Cerambycidae.
