= Eupempelus spinithorax =

Scientific classification
- Domain: Eukaryota
- Kingdom: Animalia
- Phylum: Arthropoda
- Class: Insecta
- Order: Coleoptera
- Suborder: Polyphaga
- Infraorder: Cucujiformia
- Family: Cerambycidae
- Genus: Eupempelus
- Species: E. spinithorax

Binomial name
- Eupempelus spinithorax Mermudes & Napp, 2001

Species of beetle

Eupempelus spinithorax is a species of beetle in the family Cerambycidae. It was described by Mermudes and Napp in 2001.
