= Homogenes mimus =

Scientific classification
- Kingdom: Animalia
- Phylum: Arthropoda
- Class: Insecta
- Order: Coleoptera
- Suborder: Polyphaga
- Infraorder: Cucujiformia
- Family: Cerambycidae
- Genus: Homogenes
- Species: H. mimus

Binomial name
- Homogenes mimus Napp & dos Santos, 1996

Species of beetle

Homogenes mimus is a species of beetle in the family Cerambycidae. It was described by Napp and dos Santos in 1996.
