= Homogenes albolineatus =

Scientific classification
- Kingdom: Animalia
- Phylum: Arthropoda
- Class: Insecta
- Order: Coleoptera
- Suborder: Polyphaga
- Infraorder: Cucujiformia
- Family: Cerambycidae
- Genus: Homogenes
- Species: H. albolineatus

Binomial name
- Homogenes albolineatus (Buquet in Guérin-Méneville, 1844)

Species of beetle

Homogenes albolineatus is a species of beetle in the family Cerambycidae. It was described by Buquet in 1844.
