= Eupempelus olivaceus =

Scientific classification
- Domain: Eukaryota
- Kingdom: Animalia
- Phylum: Arthropoda
- Class: Insecta
- Order: Coleoptera
- Suborder: Polyphaga
- Infraorder: Cucujiformia
- Family: Cerambycidae
- Genus: Eupempelus
- Species: E. olivaceus

Binomial name
- Eupempelus olivaceus Bates, 1870

Species of beetle

Eupempelus olivaceus is a species of beetle in the family Cerambycidae. It was described by Henry Walter Bates in 1870.
