= Chrysoprasis suturella =

Scientific classification
- Kingdom: Animalia
- Phylum: Arthropoda
- Class: Insecta
- Order: Coleoptera
- Suborder: Polyphaga
- Infraorder: Cucujiformia
- Family: Cerambycidae
- Genus: Chrysoprasis
- Species: C. suturella

Binomial name
- Chrysoprasis suturella White, 1853

Species of beetle

Chrysoprasis suturella is a species of beetle in the family Cerambycidae. It was described by White in 1853.
