= Chrysoprasis moerens =

Scientific classification
- Kingdom: Animalia
- Phylum: Arthropoda
- Clade: Pancrustacea
- Class: Insecta
- Order: Coleoptera
- Suborder: Polyphaga
- Infraorder: Cucujiformia
- Family: Cerambycidae
- Genus: Chrysoprasis
- Species: C. moerens

Binomial name
- Chrysoprasis moerens White, 1853

Species of beetle

Chrysoprasis moerens is a species of beetle in the family Cerambycidae. It was described by White in 1853. It is found in Venezuela, French Guiana and Brazil (Amazonas, Pará, Maranhão, Piauí).
