= Erythrochiton (beetle) =

Scientific classification
- Kingdom: Animalia
- Phylum: Arthropoda
- Class: Insecta
- Order: Coleoptera
- Suborder: Polyphaga
- Infraorder: Cucujiformia
- Family: Cerambycidae
- Subfamily: Cerambycinae
- Tribe: Dichophyiini
- Genus: Erythrochiton; Zajciw, 1957

Genus of beetles

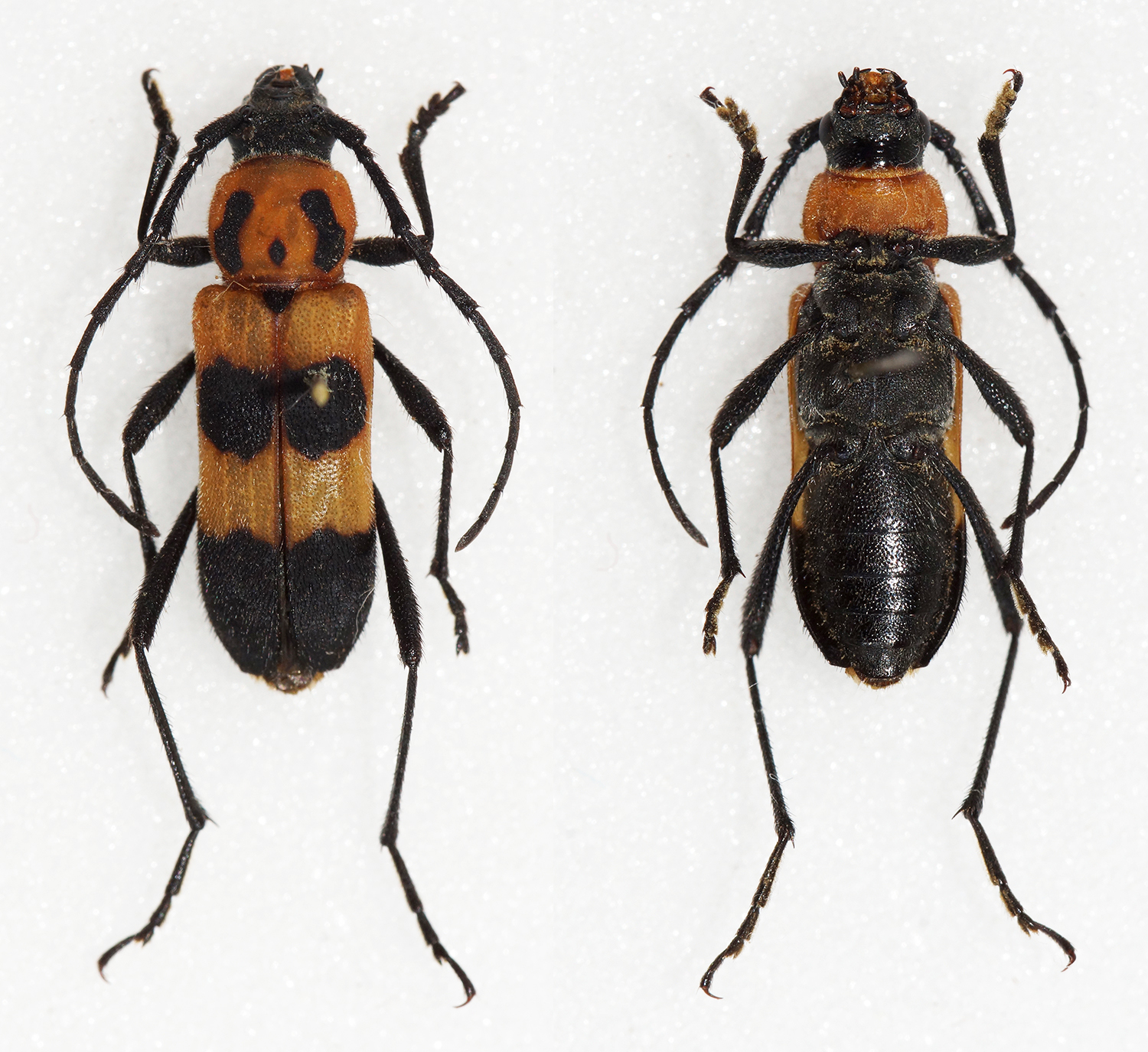
Erythrochiton jucundum

Erythrochiton is a genus of beetles in the family Cerambycidae, containing the following species:

- Erythrochiton jucundum (Gounelle, 1913)
- Erythrochiton nigrosignatum Zajciw, 1957
- Erythrochiton rubronigrum Napp & Santos, 1996
- Erythrochiton sellatum (Buquet in Guérin-Méneville, 1844)
