= Chrysoprasis dutreuxi =

Scientific classification
- Kingdom: Animalia
- Phylum: Arthropoda
- Class: Insecta
- Order: Coleoptera
- Suborder: Polyphaga
- Infraorder: Cucujiformia
- Family: Cerambycidae
- Genus: Chrysoprasis
- Species: C. dutreuxi

Binomial name
- Chrysoprasis dutreuxi Lameere, 1884

Species of beetle

Chrysoprasis dutreuxi is a species of beetle in the family Cerambycidae. It was described by Lameere in 1884.
