= Chrysoprasis morana =

Scientific classification
- Kingdom: Animalia
- Phylum: Arthropoda
- Clade: Pancrustacea
- Class: Insecta
- Order: Coleoptera
- Suborder: Polyphaga
- Infraorder: Cucujiformia
- Family: Cerambycidae
- Genus: Chrysoprasis
- Species: C. morana

Binomial name
- Chrysoprasis morana Napp & Martins, 2009

Species of beetle

Chrysoprasis morana is a species of beetle in the family Cerambycidae. It was described by Napp and Martins in 2009. It is found in Bolivia.
