= Chrysoprasis suturalis =

Scientific classification
- Kingdom: Animalia
- Phylum: Arthropoda
- Class: Insecta
- Order: Coleoptera
- Suborder: Polyphaga
- Infraorder: Cucujiformia
- Family: Cerambycidae
- Genus: Chrysoprasis
- Species: C. suturalis

Binomial name
- Chrysoprasis suturalis Lameere, 1884

Species of beetle

Chrysoprasis suturalis is a species of beetle in the family Cerambycidae. It was first described by Auguste Lameere in 1884.
