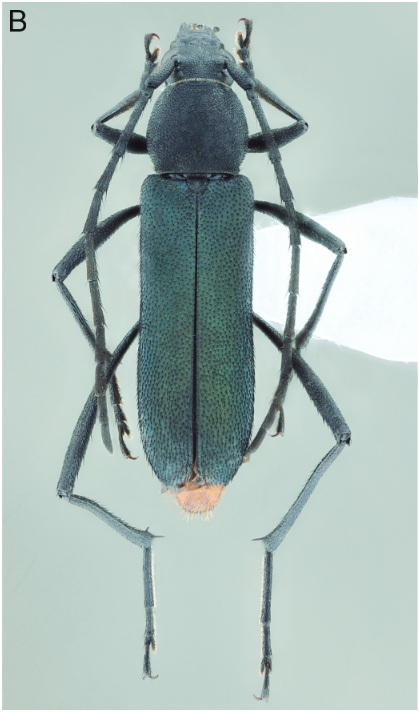

Scientific classification
- Kingdom: Animalia
- Phylum: Arthropoda
- Clade: Pancrustacea
- Class: Insecta
- Order: Coleoptera
- Suborder: Polyphaga
- Infraorder: Cucujiformia
- Family: Cerambycidae
- Genus: Chrysoprasis
- Species: C. nigrina

Binomial name
- Chrysoprasis nigrina Bates, 1870

= Chrysoprasis nigrina =

Species of beetle

Chrysoprasis nigrina is a species of beetle in the family Cerambycidae. It was described by Bates in 1870. It is found in Brazil (Mato Grosso do Sul, Bahia, Minas Gerais, Espírito Santo, Rio de Janeiro, and São Paulo).
