= Chrysoprasis cuiciuna =

Scientific classification
- Kingdom: Animalia
- Phylum: Arthropoda
- Clade: Pancrustacea
- Class: Insecta
- Order: Coleoptera
- Suborder: Polyphaga
- Infraorder: Cucujiformia
- Family: Cerambycidae
- Genus: Chrysoprasis
- Species: C. cuiciuna

Binomial name
- Chrysoprasis cuiciuna Napp & Martins, 1998

Species of beetle

Chrysoprasis cuiciuna is a species of beetle in the family Cerambycidae. It was described by Napp and Martins in 1998. It is found in Venezuela.
