= Chrysoprasis principalis =

Scientific classification
- Kingdom: Animalia
- Phylum: Arthropoda
- Class: Insecta
- Order: Coleoptera
- Suborder: Polyphaga
- Infraorder: Cucujiformia
- Family: Cerambycidae
- Genus: Chrysoprasis
- Species: C. principalis

Binomial name
- Chrysoprasis principalis Napp & Martins, 2009

Species of beetle

Chrysoprasis principalis is a species of beetle in the family Cerambycidae. It was described by Napp and Martins in 2009.
