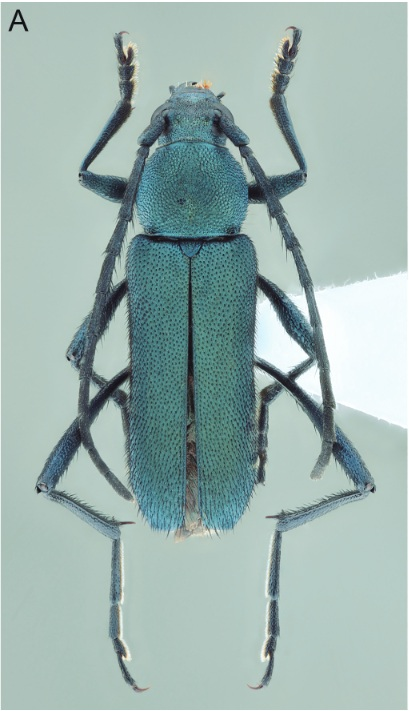

Scientific classification
- Kingdom: Animalia
- Phylum: Arthropoda
- Clade: Pancrustacea
- Class: Insecta
- Order: Coleoptera
- Suborder: Polyphaga
- Infraorder: Cucujiformia
- Family: Cerambycidae
- Genus: Chrysoprasis
- Species: C. concolor

Binomial name
- Chrysoprasis concolor Redtenbacher, 1868

Synonyms
- Chrysoprasis punctiventris Bates, 1870

= Chrysoprasis concolor =

Species of beetle

Chrysoprasis concolor is a species of beetle in the family Cerambycidae. It was described by Redtenbacher in 1868. It is found in Bolivia, Brazil, Paraguay, Argentina and Uruguay.
