= Erythropterus =

Scientific classification
- Kingdom: Animalia
- Phylum: Arthropoda
- Class: Insecta
- Order: Coleoptera
- Suborder: Polyphaga
- Infraorder: Cucujiformia
- Family: Cerambycidae
- Subfamily: Cerambycinae
- Tribe: Dichophyiini
- Genus: Erythropterus; Melzer, 1934

Genus of beetles

Erythropterus is a genus of beetles in the family Cerambycidae, containing the following species:

- Erythropterus amabilis Melzer, 1934
- Erythropterus boliviensis Clarke, 2007
- Erythropterus cuissi Napp & Monné, 2005
- Erythropterus kochi Clarke, 2007
- Erythropterus urucuri Martins & Galileo, 2004
