= Chrysoprasis nana =

Scientific classification
- Kingdom: Animalia
- Phylum: Arthropoda
- Clade: Pancrustacea
- Class: Insecta
- Order: Coleoptera
- Suborder: Polyphaga
- Infraorder: Cucujiformia
- Family: Cerambycidae
- Genus: Chrysoprasis
- Species: C. nana

Binomial name
- Chrysoprasis nana Bates, 1870

Species of beetle

Chrysoprasis nana is a species of beetle in the family Cerambycidae. It was described by Henry Walter Bates in 1870. It is found in French Guiana and Brazil (Pará).
