= Chrysoprasis nigristernis =

Scientific classification
- Kingdom: Animalia
- Phylum: Arthropoda
- Clade: Pancrustacea
- Class: Insecta
- Order: Coleoptera
- Suborder: Polyphaga
- Infraorder: Cucujiformia
- Family: Cerambycidae
- Genus: Chrysoprasis
- Species: C. nigristernis

Binomial name
- Chrysoprasis nigristernis Zajciw, 1960

Species of beetle

Chrysoprasis nigristernis is a species of beetle in the family Cerambycidae. It was described by Zajciw in 1960. It is found in Brazil (Rio de Janeiro).
