= Championa suturalis =

Scientific classification
- Kingdom: Animalia
- Phylum: Arthropoda
- Class: Insecta
- Order: Coleoptera
- Suborder: Polyphaga
- Infraorder: Cucujiformia
- Family: Cerambycidae
- Genus: Championa
- Species: C. suturalis

Binomial name
- Championa suturalis Chemsak, 1967

Species of beetle

Championa suturalis is a species of beetle in the family Cerambycidae. It was described by Chemsak in 1967.
