= Eryphus flavicollis =

Scientific classification
- Kingdom: Animalia
- Phylum: Arthropoda
- Class: Insecta
- Order: Coleoptera
- Suborder: Polyphaga
- Infraorder: Cucujiformia
- Family: Cerambycidae
- Genus: Eryphus
- Species: E. flavicollis

Binomial name
- Eryphus flavicollis (Fisher, 1938)

Species of beetle

Eryphus flavicollis is a species of beetle in the family Cerambycidae. It was described by Fisher in 1938.
