= Allodemus tricolor =

Scientific classification
- Kingdom: Animalia
- Phylum: Arthropoda
- Class: Insecta
- Order: Coleoptera
- Suborder: Polyphaga
- Infraorder: Cucujiformia
- Family: Cerambycidae
- Genus: Allodemus
- Species: A. tricolor

Binomial name
- Allodemus tricolor (Perty, 1832)

Species of beetle

Allodemus tricolor is a species of beetle in the family Cerambycidae. It was described by Perty in 1832.
