= Eriphosoma jacobi =

Scientific classification
- Kingdom: Animalia
- Phylum: Arthropoda
- Class: Insecta
- Order: Coleoptera
- Suborder: Polyphaga
- Infraorder: Cucujiformia
- Family: Cerambycidae
- Genus: Eriphosoma
- Species: E. jacobi

Binomial name
- Eriphosoma jacobi E. Fuchs, 1961

Species of beetle

Eriphosoma jacobi is a species of beetle in the family Cerambycidae. It was described by Ernst Fuchs in 1961.
