= Chrysoprasis viridis =

Scientific classification
- Kingdom: Animalia
- Phylum: Arthropoda
- Class: Insecta
- Order: Coleoptera
- Suborder: Polyphaga
- Infraorder: Cucujiformia
- Family: Cerambycidae
- Genus: Chrysoprasis
- Species: C. viridis

Binomial name
- Chrysoprasis viridis Fisher, 1944

Species of beetle

Chrysoprasis viridis is a species of beetle in the family Cerambycidae. It was described by Fisher in 1944.
