= Chrysoprasis valida =

Scientific classification
- Kingdom: Animalia
- Phylum: Arthropoda
- Class: Insecta
- Order: Coleoptera
- Suborder: Polyphaga
- Infraorder: Cucujiformia
- Family: Cerambycidae
- Genus: Chrysoprasis
- Species: C. valida

Binomial name
- Chrysoprasis valida Bates, 1870

Species of beetle

Chrysoprasis valida is a species of beetle in the family Cerambycidae. It was described by Henry Walter Bates in 1870.
