= Chrysoprasis guerrerensis =

Scientific classification
- Kingdom: Animalia
- Phylum: Arthropoda
- Class: Insecta
- Order: Coleoptera
- Suborder: Polyphaga
- Infraorder: Cucujiformia
- Family: Cerambycidae
- Genus: Chrysoprasis
- Species: C. guerrerensis

Binomial name
- Chrysoprasis guerrerensis Bates, 1892

Species of beetle

Chrysoprasis guerrerensis is a species of beetle in the family Cerambycidae. It was described by Bates in 1892.
