= Allodemus centromaculatus =

Scientific classification
- Kingdom: Animalia
- Phylum: Arthropoda
- Class: Insecta
- Order: Coleoptera
- Suborder: Polyphaga
- Infraorder: Cucujiformia
- Family: Cerambycidae
- Genus: Allodemus
- Species: A. centromaculatus

Binomial name
- Allodemus centromaculatus Zajciw, 1968

Species of beetle

Allodemus centromaculatus is a species of beetle in the family Cerambycidae. It was described by Zajciw in 1968.
