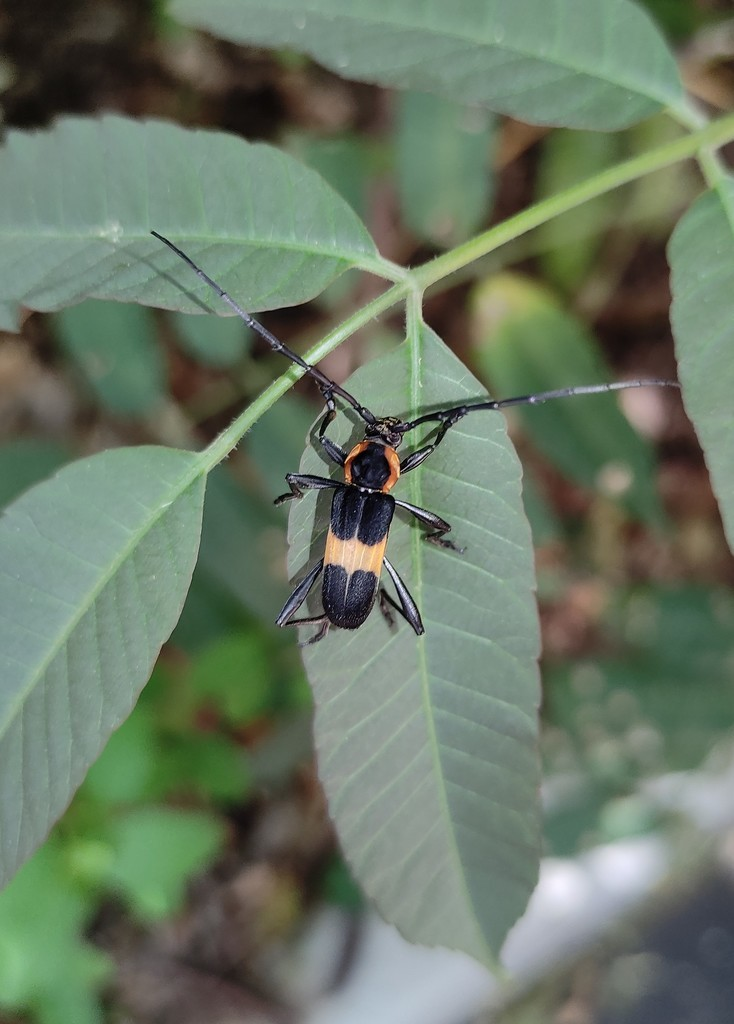

Scientific classification
- Kingdom: Animalia
- Phylum: Arthropoda
- Class: Insecta
- Order: Coleoptera
- Suborder: Polyphaga
- Infraorder: Cucujiformia
- Family: Cerambycidae
- Genus: Mallosoma
- Species: M. zonatum

Binomial name
- Mallosoma zonatum (Sahlberg, 1823)

= Mallosoma zonatum =

Species of beetle

Mallosoma zonatum is a species of beetle in the family Cerambycidae. It was described by Sahlberg in 1823.
