= Tobipuranga auricollis =

Scientific classification
- Kingdom: Animalia
- Phylum: Arthropoda
- Class: Insecta
- Order: Coleoptera
- Suborder: Polyphaga
- Infraorder: Cucujiformia
- Family: Cerambycidae
- Genus: Tobipuranga
- Species: T. auricollis

Binomial name
- Tobipuranga auricollis (Dalman in Schoenherr, 1817)

Species of beetle

Tobipuranga auricollis is a species of beetle in the family Cerambycidae. It was described by Dalman in 1817.
