= Eryphus carinatus =

Scientific classification
- Kingdom: Animalia
- Phylum: Arthropoda
- Clade: Pancrustacea
- Class: Insecta
- Order: Coleoptera
- Suborder: Polyphaga
- Infraorder: Cucujiformia
- Family: Cerambycidae
- Genus: Eryphus
- Species: E. carinatus

Binomial name
- Eryphus carinatus (Zajciw, 1970)

Species of beetle

Eryphus carinatus is a species of beetle in the family Cerambycidae. It was described by Dmytro Zajciw in 1970.
