= Callideriphus tucumanus =

Scientific classification
- Domain: Eukaryota
- Kingdom: Animalia
- Phylum: Arthropoda
- Class: Insecta
- Order: Coleoptera
- Suborder: Polyphaga
- Infraorder: Cucujiformia
- Family: Cerambycidae
- Genus: Callideriphus
- Species: C. tucumanus

Binomial name
- Callideriphus tucumanus Napp & Martins, 2002

Species of beetle

Callideriphus tucumanus is a species of beetle in the family Cerambycidae. It was described by Napp and Martins in 2002.
