= Chrysoprasis pilosa =

Scientific classification
- Kingdom: Animalia
- Phylum: Arthropoda
- Clade: Pancrustacea
- Class: Insecta
- Order: Coleoptera
- Suborder: Polyphaga
- Infraorder: Cucujiformia
- Family: Cerambycidae
- Genus: Chrysoprasis
- Species: C. pilosa

Binomial name
- Chrysoprasis pilosa Galileo & Martins, 2003

Species of beetle

Chrysoprasis pilosa is a species of beetle in the family Cerambycidae. It was described by Galileo and Martins in 2003. It is found in Colombia.
