= Eriphosoma bipartitum =

Scientific classification
- Kingdom: Animalia
- Phylum: Arthropoda
- Class: Insecta
- Order: Coleoptera
- Suborder: Polyphaga
- Infraorder: Cucujiformia
- Family: Cerambycidae
- Genus: Eriphosoma
- Species: E. bipartitum

Binomial name
- Eriphosoma bipartitum (Buquet in Guérin-Méneville, 1844)

Species of beetle

Eriphosoma bipartitum is a species of beetle in the family Cerambycidae. It was described by Buquet in 1844.
