= Chrysoprasis grupiara =

Scientific classification
- Kingdom: Animalia
- Phylum: Arthropoda
- Clade: Pancrustacea
- Class: Insecta
- Order: Coleoptera
- Suborder: Polyphaga
- Infraorder: Cucujiformia
- Family: Cerambycidae
- Genus: Chrysoprasis
- Species: C. grupiara

Binomial name
- Chrysoprasis grupiara Napp & Martins, 2009

Species of beetle

Chrysoprasis grupiara is a species of beetle in the family Cerambycidae. It was described by Napp and Martins in 2009. It is found in Brazil (Rondônia).
