= Tobipuranga longicornis =

Scientific classification
- Kingdom: Animalia
- Phylum: Arthropoda
- Class: Insecta
- Order: Coleoptera
- Suborder: Polyphaga
- Infraorder: Cucujiformia
- Family: Cerambycidae
- Genus: Tobipuranga
- Species: T. longicornis

Binomial name
- Tobipuranga longicornis (Bates, 1870)

Species of beetle

Tobipuranga longicornis is a species of beetle in the family Cerambycidae. It was described by Henry Walter Bates in 1870.
