= Chrysoprasis linearis =

Scientific classification
- Kingdom: Animalia
- Phylum: Arthropoda
- Clade: Pancrustacea
- Class: Insecta
- Order: Coleoptera
- Suborder: Polyphaga
- Infraorder: Cucujiformia
- Family: Cerambycidae
- Genus: Chrysoprasis
- Species: C. linearis

Binomial name
- Chrysoprasis linearis Bates, 1870

Species of beetle

Chrysoprasis linearis is a species of beetle in the family Cerambycidae. It was described by Henry Walter Bates in 1870. It is found in Brazil (Goiás, Distrito Federal, Bahia, Minas Gerais, Espírito Santo, Rio de Janeiro, São Paulo, Paraná, Santa Catarina, Rio Grande do Sul), Paraguay and Argentina (Misiones, Chaco).
