= Erythrochiton rubronigrum =

Scientific classification
- Kingdom: Animalia
- Phylum: Arthropoda
- Class: Insecta
- Order: Coleoptera
- Suborder: Polyphaga
- Infraorder: Cucujiformia
- Family: Cerambycidae
- Genus: Erythrochiton
- Species: E. rubronigrum

Binomial name
- Erythrochiton rubronigrum Napp & Santos, 1996

Species of beetle

Erythrochiton rubronigrum is a species of beetle in the family Cerambycidae. It was described by Napp and Santos in 1996.
