= Stratone aurantia =

Scientific classification
- Domain: Eukaryota
- Kingdom: Animalia
- Phylum: Arthropoda
- Class: Insecta
- Order: Coleoptera
- Suborder: Polyphaga
- Infraorder: Cucujiformia
- Family: Cerambycidae
- Genus: Stratone
- Species: S. aurantia

Binomial name
- Stratone aurantia Galileo & Martins, 1992

Species of beetle

Stratone aurantia is a species of beetle in the family Cerambycidae. It was described by Galileo and Martins in 1992.
