= Pseudothonalmus major =

Scientific classification
- Kingdom: Animalia
- Phylum: Arthropoda
- Class: Insecta
- Order: Coleoptera
- Suborder: Polyphaga
- Infraorder: Cucujiformia
- Family: Cerambycidae
- Genus: Pseudothonalmus
- Species: P. major

Binomial name
- Pseudothonalmus major (Gahan, 1895)

Species of beetle

Pseudothonalmus major is a species of beetle in the family Cerambycidae. It was described by Gahan in 1895.
