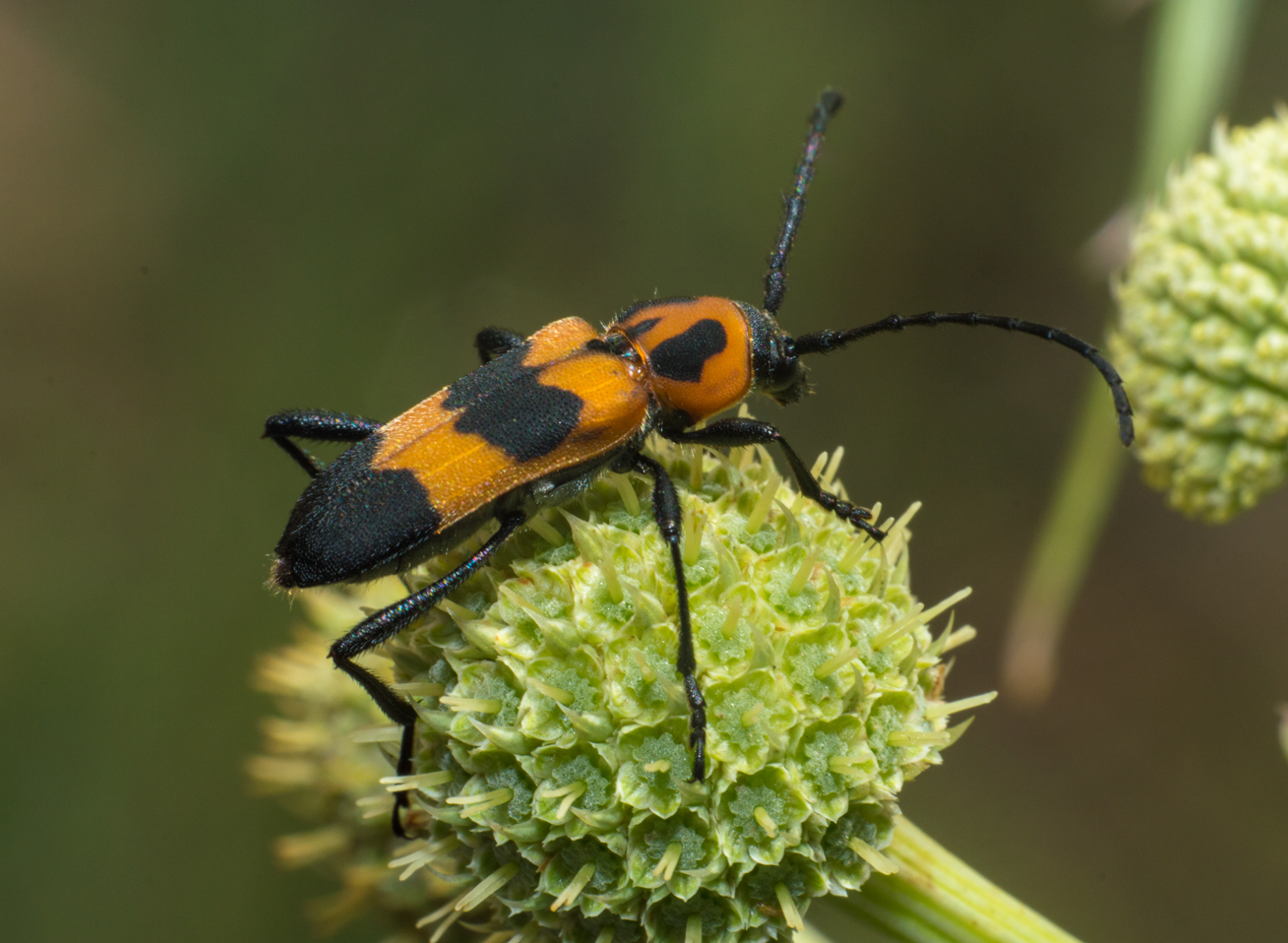
- E. jucundum from Argentina

Scientific classification
- Kingdom: Animalia
- Phylum: Arthropoda
- Class: Insecta
- Order: Coleoptera
- Suborder: Polyphaga
- Infraorder: Cucujiformia
- Family: Cerambycidae
- Genus: Erythrochiton
- Species: E. jucundum

Binomial name
- Erythrochiton jucundum (Gounelle, 1913)

= Erythrochiton jucundum =

Species of beetle

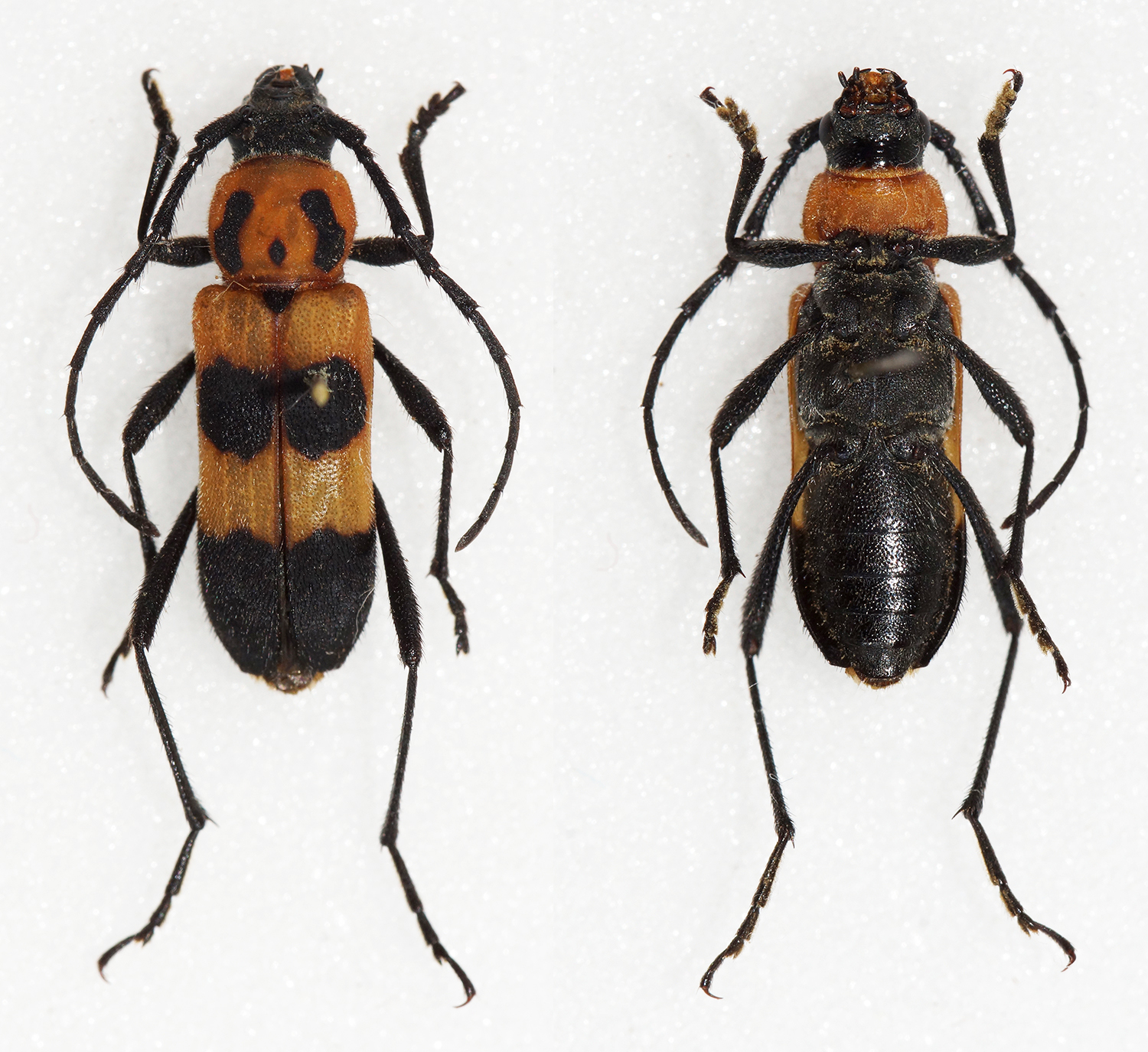
female from Argentina

Erythrochiton jucundum is a species of beetle in the family Cerambycidae. It was described by Gounelle in 1913.
