= Eryphus carioca =

Scientific classification
- Kingdom: Animalia
- Phylum: Arthropoda
- Class: Insecta
- Order: Coleoptera
- Suborder: Polyphaga
- Infraorder: Cucujiformia
- Family: Cerambycidae
- Genus: Eryphus
- Species: E. carioca

Binomial name
- Eryphus carioca Napp & Martins, 2002

Species of beetle

Eryphus carioca is a species of beetle in the family Cerambycidae. It was described by Napp and Martins in 2002.
