= Chrysoprasis ritcheri =

Scientific classification
- Kingdom: Animalia
- Phylum: Arthropoda
- Clade: Pancrustacea
- Class: Insecta
- Order: Coleoptera
- Suborder: Polyphaga
- Infraorder: Cucujiformia
- Family: Cerambycidae
- Genus: Chrysoprasis
- Species: C. ritcheri

Binomial name
- Chrysoprasis ritcheri Gounelle, 1913

Species of beetle

Chrysoprasis ritcheri is a species of beetle in the family Cerambycidae. It was described by Gounelle in 1913. It is found in Bolivia, Brazil (Ceará, Paraíba, Goiás, Minas Gerais), Paraguay and Argentina (Salta, Santiago del Estero, Tucumán).
