= Homogenes =

Scientific classification
- Kingdom: Animalia
- Phylum: Arthropoda
- Class: Insecta
- Order: Coleoptera
- Suborder: Polyphaga
- Infraorder: Cucujiformia
- Family: Cerambycidae
- Subfamily: Cerambycinae
- Tribe: Dichophyiini
- Genus: Homogenes; Chevrolat, 1863

Genus of beetles

Homogenes is a genus of beetles in the family Cerambycidae, containing the following species:

- Homogenes albolineatus (Buquet in Guérin-Méneville, 1844)
- Homogenes leprieurii (Buquet in Guérin-Méneville, 1844)
- Homogenes mimus Napp & dos Santos, 1996
- Homogenes rubrogaster Napp & dos Santos, 1996
