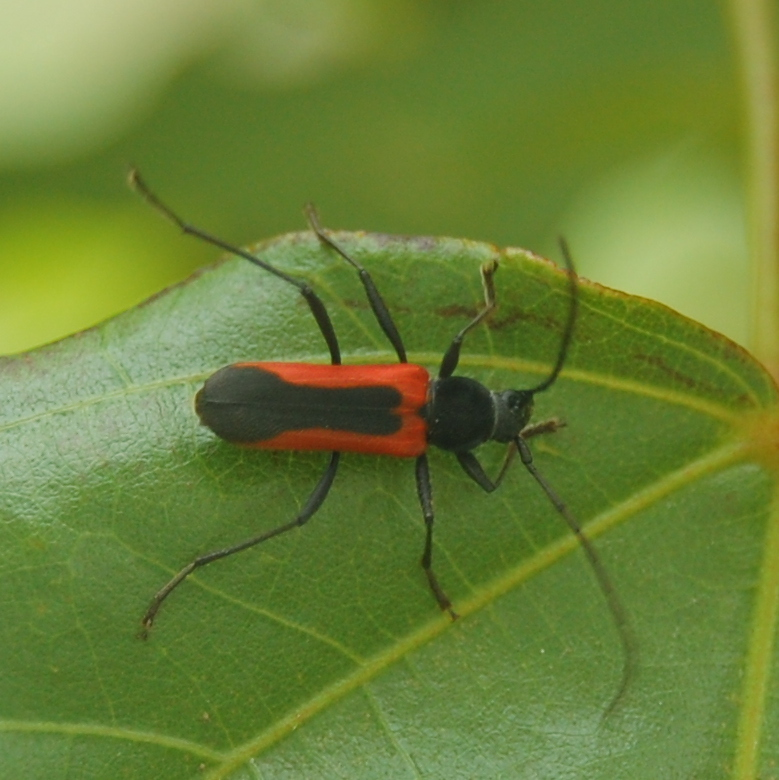

Scientific classification
- Kingdom: Animalia
- Phylum: Arthropoda
- Clade: Pancrustacea
- Class: Insecta
- Order: Coleoptera
- Suborder: Polyphaga
- Infraorder: Cucujiformia
- Family: Cerambycidae
- Genus: Erythrochiton
- Species: E. sellatum

Binomial name
- Erythrochiton sellatum (Buquet in Guérin-Méneville, 1844)

= Erythrochiton sellatum =

Species of beetle

Erythrochiton sellatum is a species of beetle in the family Cerambycidae. It was first described by Buquet in 1844.
