= Tobipuranga ybyra =

Scientific classification
- Kingdom: Animalia
- Phylum: Arthropoda
- Class: Insecta
- Order: Coleoptera
- Suborder: Polyphaga
- Infraorder: Cucujiformia
- Family: Cerambycidae
- Genus: Tobipuranga
- Species: T. ybyra

Binomial name
- Tobipuranga ybyra Napp & Martins, 1996

Species of beetle

Tobipuranga ybyra is a species of beetle in the family Cerambycidae. It was described by Napp and Martins in 1996.
