= Chrysoprasis tobiuna =

Scientific classification
- Kingdom: Animalia
- Phylum: Arthropoda
- Clade: Pancrustacea
- Class: Insecta
- Order: Coleoptera
- Suborder: Polyphaga
- Infraorder: Cucujiformia
- Family: Cerambycidae
- Genus: Chrysoprasis
- Species: C. tobiuna

Binomial name
- Chrysoprasis tobiuna Napp & Martins, 1998

Species of beetle

Chrysoprasis tobiuna is a species of beetle in the family Cerambycidae. It was described by Napp and Martins in 1998. It is found in Bolivia.
