= Chrysoprasis atrata =

Scientific classification
- Kingdom: Animalia
- Phylum: Arthropoda
- Clade: Pancrustacea
- Class: Insecta
- Order: Coleoptera
- Suborder: Polyphaga
- Infraorder: Cucujiformia
- Family: Cerambycidae
- Genus: Chrysoprasis
- Species: C. atrata

Binomial name
- Chrysoprasis atrata Bates, 1872

Species of beetle

Chrysoprasis atrata is a species of beetle in the family Cerambycidae. It was described by Bates in 1872. It is found in Venezuela.
