= Chrysoprasis aeneicollis =

Scientific classification
- Kingdom: Animalia
- Phylum: Arthropoda
- Class: Insecta
- Order: Coleoptera
- Suborder: Polyphaga
- Infraorder: Cucujiformia
- Family: Cerambycidae
- Genus: Chrysoprasis
- Species: C. aeneicollis

Binomial name
- Chrysoprasis aeneicollis (Buquet in Guérin-Méneville, 1844)

Species of beetle

Chrysoprasis aeneicollis is a species of beetle in the family Cerambycidae. It was described by Buquet in 1844.
