= Erythrochiton nigrosignatus =

Scientific classification
- Kingdom: Animalia
- Phylum: Arthropoda
- Class: Insecta
- Order: Coleoptera
- Suborder: Polyphaga
- Infraorder: Cucujiformia
- Family: Cerambycidae
- Genus: Erythrochiton
- Species: E. nigrosignatum

Binomial name
- Erythrochiton nigrosignatum Zajciw, 1957

Species of beetle

Erythrochiton nigrosignatum is a species of beetle in the family Cerambycidae. It was described by Zajciw in 1957.
