= Chrysoprasis auriventris =

Scientific classification
- Kingdom: Animalia
- Phylum: Arthropoda
- Class: Insecta
- Order: Coleoptera
- Suborder: Polyphaga
- Infraorder: Cucujiformia
- Family: Cerambycidae
- Genus: Chrysoprasis
- Species: C. auriventris

Binomial name
- Chrysoprasis auriventris Redtenbacher, 1868

Species of beetle

Chrysoprasis auriventris is a species of beetle in the family Cerambycidae. It was described by Redtenbacher in 1868.
