= Pseudothonalmus terminalis =

Scientific classification
- Kingdom: Animalia
- Phylum: Arthropoda
- Class: Insecta
- Order: Coleoptera
- Suborder: Polyphaga
- Infraorder: Cucujiformia
- Family: Cerambycidae
- Genus: Pseudothonalmus
- Species: P. terminalis

Binomial name
- Pseudothonalmus terminalis (White, 1853)

Species of beetle

Pseudothonalmus terminalis is a species of beetle in the family Cerambycidae. It was described by White in 1853.
