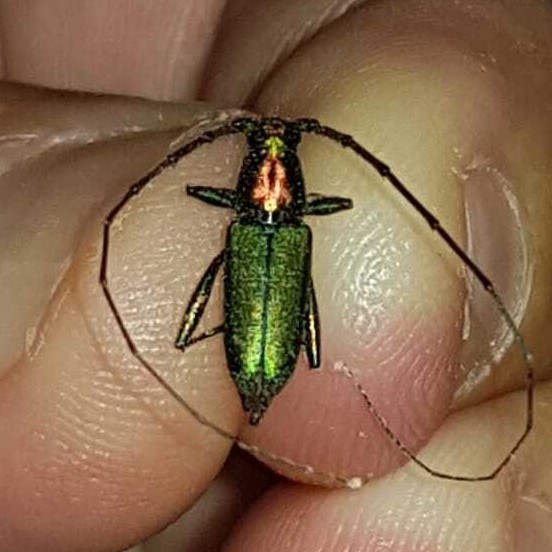

Scientific classification
- Kingdom: Animalia
- Phylum: Arthropoda
- Clade: Pancrustacea
- Class: Insecta
- Order: Coleoptera
- Suborder: Polyphaga
- Infraorder: Cucujiformia
- Family: Cerambycidae
- Genus: Tobipuranga
- Species: T. chlorogaster

Binomial name
- Tobipuranga chlorogaster (Aurivillius, 1910)

= Tobipuranga chlorogaster =

Species of beetle

Tobipuranga chlorogaster is a species of beetle in the family Cerambycidae. It was first described by Per Olof Christopher Aurivillius in 1910.
