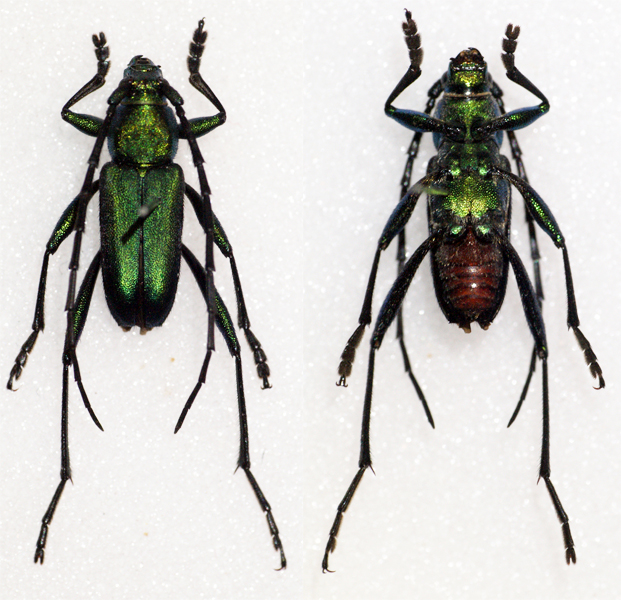
- Chrysoprasis hypocrita

Scientific classification
- Kingdom: Animalia
- Phylum: Arthropoda
- Clade: Pancrustacea
- Class: Insecta
- Order: Coleoptera
- Suborder: Polyphaga
- Infraorder: Cucujiformia
- Family: Cerambycidae
- Subfamily: Cerambycinae
- Tribe: Dichophyiini
- Genus: Chrysoprasis; Audinet-Serville, 1834

= Chrysoprasis =

Genus of beetles

Chrysoprasis is a genus of beetles in the family Cerambycidae, containing the following species:

- Chrysoprasis abyara Napp & Martins, 1998
- Chrysoprasis aeneicollis (Buquet in Guérin-Méneville, 1844)
- Chrysoprasis aeneiventris Bates, 1870
- Chrysoprasis airi Napp & Martins, 1997
- Chrysoprasis atrata Bates, 1872
- Chrysoprasis aurata Aurivillius, 1910
- Chrysoprasis aureicollis White, 1853
- Chrysoprasis aurigena (Germar, 1824)
- Chrysoprasis auriventris Redtenbacher, 1868
- Chrysoprasis basalis Chevrolat, 1859
- Chrysoprasis beraba Napp & Martins, 1997
- Chrysoprasis bicolor (Olivier, 1790)
- Chrysoprasis bipartita Zajciw, 1963
- Chrysoprasis catarina Napp & Martins, 1998
- Chrysoprasis chalybea Redtenbacher, 1868
- Chrysoprasis chevrolati Lameere, 1884
- Chrysoprasis collaris Chevrolat, 1859
- Chrysoprasis concolor Redtenbacher, 1868
- Chrysoprasis cuiciuna Napp & Martins, 1998
- Chrysoprasis dutreuxi Lameere, 1884
- Chrysoprasis festiva Audinet-Serville, 1834
- Chrysoprasis globulicollis Zajciw, 1958
- Chrysoprasis gracilis Vlasak & Santos-Silva, 2026
- Chrysoprasis grupiara Napp & Martins, 2009
- Chrysoprasis guerrerensis Bates, 1892
- Chrysoprasis hirtula White, 1853
- Chrysoprasis hispidula Bates, 1870
- Chrysoprasis hypocrita Erichson, 1847
- Chrysoprasis ibaca Napp & Martins, 1997
- Chrysoprasis icuara Napp & Martins, 1998
- Chrysoprasis imitatrix Galileo, Martins, Le Tirant & Santos-Silva, 2014
- Chrysoprasis itaiuba Napp & Martins, 1997
- Chrysoprasis linearis Bates, 1870
- Chrysoprasis marta Napp & Martins, 1999
- Chrysoprasis maryhowardae Clarke, 2015
- Chrysoprasis melanostetha Bates, 1870
- Chrysoprasis moerens White, 1853
- Chrysoprasis morana Napp & Martins, 2009
- Chrysoprasis nana Bates, 1870
- Chrysoprasis nigrina Bates, 1870
- Chrysoprasis nigristernis Zajciw, 1960
- Chrysoprasis nitidisternis Zajciw, 1960
- Chrysoprasis nymphula Bates, 1870
- Chrysoprasis obiuna Napp & Martins, 1997
- Chrysoprasis pacifica Napp & Martins, 1995
- Chrysoprasis para Napp & Martins, 1998
- Chrysoprasis pilosa Galileo & Martins, 2003
- Chrysoprasis piriana Napp & Martins, 1999
- Chrysoprasis pitanga Napp & Martins, 1999
- Chrysoprasis poticuara Napp & Martins, 1997
- Chrysoprasis potiuna Napp & Martins, 1997
- Chrysoprasis principalis Napp & Martins, 2009
- Chrysoprasis punctulata Bates, 1870
- Chrysoprasis quadrimaculata Gounelle, 1913
- Chrysoprasis reticulicollis Zajciw, 1958
- Chrysoprasis ritcheri Gounelle, 1913
- Chrysoprasis rotundicollis Bates, 1870
- Chrysoprasis rubricollis Napp & Martins, 2006
- Chrysoprasis rugulicollis Bates, 1870
- Chrysoprasis sapphirina Gounelle, 1911
- Chrysoprasis seticornis Bates, 1880
- Chrysoprasis sobrina Bates, 1870
- Chrysoprasis suturalis Lameere, 1884
- Chrysoprasis suturella White, 1853
- Chrysoprasis tendira Napp & Martins, 1998
- Chrysoprasis timapeba Napp & Martins, 1997
- Chrysoprasis tobiuna Napp & Martins, 1998
- Chrysoprasis tybyra Napp & Martins, 1998
- Chrysoprasis valida Bates, 1870
- Chrysoprasis variabilis Zajciw, 1958
- Chrysoprasis viridis Fisher, 1944
- Chrysoprasis vittata Aurivillius, 1910
