= Erythropterus boliviensis =

Scientific classification
- Kingdom: Animalia
- Phylum: Arthropoda
- Class: Insecta
- Order: Coleoptera
- Suborder: Polyphaga
- Infraorder: Cucujiformia
- Family: Cerambycidae
- Genus: Erythropterus
- Species: E. boliviensis

Binomial name
- Erythropterus boliviensis Clarke, 2007

Species of beetle

Erythropterus boliviensis is a species of beetle in the family Cerambycidae. It was described by Clarke in 2007.
