= Chrysoprasis aureicollis =

Scientific classification
- Kingdom: Animalia
- Phylum: Arthropoda
- Clade: Pancrustacea
- Class: Insecta
- Order: Coleoptera
- Suborder: Polyphaga
- Infraorder: Cucujiformia
- Family: Cerambycidae
- Genus: Chrysoprasis
- Species: C. aureicollis

Binomial name
- Chrysoprasis aureicollis White, 1853

Species of beetle

Chrysoprasis aureicollis is a species of beetle in the family Cerambycidae. It was described by White in 1853. It is found in Colombia, Venezuela, French Guiana, Bolivia and Brazil (Amazonas, Pará, Acre, Ceará).
