= Championa aliciae =

Scientific classification
- Kingdom: Animalia
- Phylum: Arthropoda
- Class: Insecta
- Order: Coleoptera
- Suborder: Polyphaga
- Infraorder: Cucujiformia
- Family: Cerambycidae
- Genus: Championa
- Species: C. aliciae

Binomial name
- Championa aliciae Noguera & Chemsak, 1997

Species of beetle

Championa aliciae is a species of beetle in the family Cerambycidae. It was described by Noguera and Chemsak in 1997.
