= Chrysoprasis rugulicollis =

Scientific classification
- Kingdom: Animalia
- Phylum: Arthropoda
- Clade: Pancrustacea
- Class: Insecta
- Order: Coleoptera
- Suborder: Polyphaga
- Infraorder: Cucujiformia
- Family: Cerambycidae
- Genus: Chrysoprasis
- Species: C. rugulicollis

Binomial name
- Chrysoprasis rugulicollis Bates, 1870

Species of beetle

Chrysoprasis rugulicollis is a species of beetle in the family Cerambycidae. It was described by Henry Walter Bates in 1870. It is found in Brazil (Bahia, Rio de Janeiro, São Paulo) and Paraguay.
