= Erythropterus kochi =

Scientific classification
- Kingdom: Animalia
- Phylum: Arthropoda
- Class: Insecta
- Order: Coleoptera
- Suborder: Polyphaga
- Infraorder: Cucujiformia
- Family: Cerambycidae
- Genus: Erythropterus
- Species: E. kochi

Binomial name
- Erythropterus kochi Clarke, 2007

Species of beetle

Erythropterus kochi is a species of beetle in the family Cerambycidae. It was described by Clarke in 2007.
