= Pseudothonalmus divisus =

Scientific classification
- Kingdom: Animalia
- Phylum: Arthropoda
- Clade: Pancrustacea
- Class: Insecta
- Order: Coleoptera
- Suborder: Polyphaga
- Infraorder: Cucujiformia
- Family: Cerambycidae
- Genus: Pseudothonalmus
- Species: P. divisus

Binomial name
- Pseudothonalmus divisus (Chevrolat, 1858)

Species of beetle

Pseudothonalmus divisus is a species of beetle in the family Cerambycidae. It was described by Chevrolat in 1858.
