= Erythropterus cuissi =

Scientific classification
- Kingdom: Animalia
- Phylum: Arthropoda
- Class: Insecta
- Order: Coleoptera
- Suborder: Polyphaga
- Infraorder: Cucujiformia
- Family: Cerambycidae
- Genus: Erythropterus
- Species: E. cuissi

Binomial name
- Erythropterus cuissi Napp & Monné, 2005

Species of beetle

Erythropterus cuissi is a species of beetle in the family Cerambycidae. It was described by Napp and Monné in 2005.
