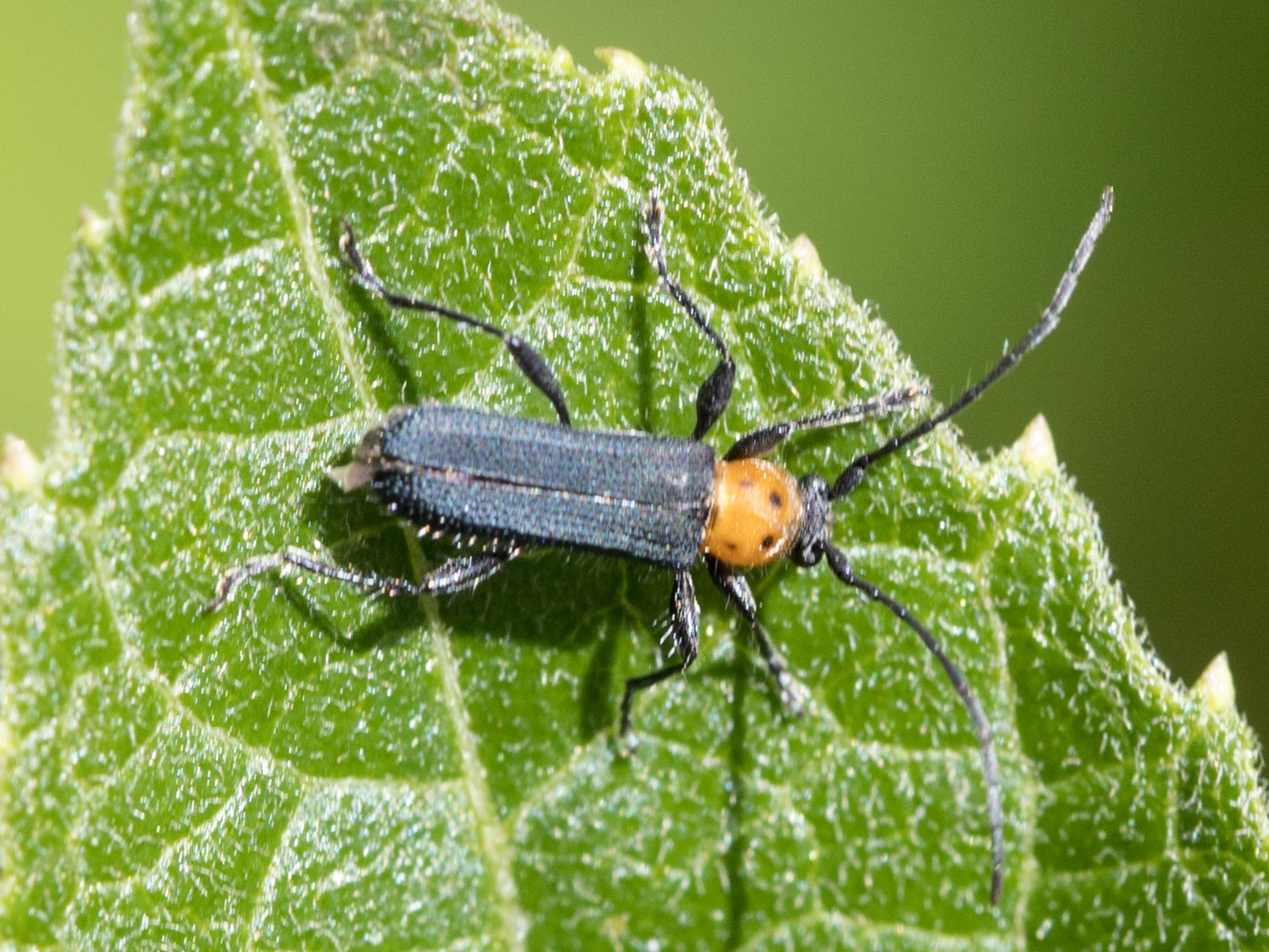

Scientific classification
- Kingdom: Animalia
- Phylum: Arthropoda
- Clade: Pancrustacea
- Class: Insecta
- Order: Coleoptera
- Suborder: Polyphaga
- Infraorder: Cucujiformia
- Family: Cerambycidae
- Genus: Eryphus
- Species: E. picticollis

Binomial name
- Eryphus picticollis (Gounelle, 1911)

= Eryphus picticollis =

Species of beetle

Eryphus picticollis is a species of beetle in the family Cerambycidae.
