= Eryphus bipunctatus =

Scientific classification
- Kingdom: Animalia
- Phylum: Arthropoda
- Class: Insecta
- Order: Coleoptera
- Suborder: Polyphaga
- Infraorder: Cucujiformia
- Family: Cerambycidae
- Genus: Eryphus
- Species: E. bipunctatus

Binomial name
- Eryphus bipunctatus (Perty, 1832)

Species of beetle

Eryphus bipunctatus is a species of beetle in the family Cerambycidae. It was described by Perty in 1832.
