= Mallosoma piptadeniae =

Scientific classification
- Kingdom: Animalia
- Phylum: Arthropoda
- Class: Insecta
- Order: Coleoptera
- Suborder: Polyphaga
- Infraorder: Cucujiformia
- Family: Cerambycidae
- Genus: Mallosoma
- Species: M. piptadeniae

Binomial name
- Mallosoma piptadeniae Giacomel, 1976

Species of beetle

Mallosoma piptadeniae is a species of beetle in the family Cerambycidae. It was described by Giacomel in 1976.
