= Chrysoprasis piriana =

Scientific classification
- Kingdom: Animalia
- Phylum: Arthropoda
- Class: Insecta
- Order: Coleoptera
- Suborder: Polyphaga
- Infraorder: Cucujiformia
- Family: Cerambycidae
- Genus: Chrysoprasis
- Species: C. piriana

Binomial name
- Chrysoprasis piriana Napp & Martins, 1999

Species of beetle

Chrysoprasis piriana is a species of beetle in the family Cerambycidae. It was described by Napp and Martins in 1999.
