= Chrysoprasis quadrimaculata =

Scientific classification
- Kingdom: Animalia
- Phylum: Arthropoda
- Class: Insecta
- Order: Coleoptera
- Suborder: Polyphaga
- Infraorder: Cucujiformia
- Family: Cerambycidae
- Genus: Chrysoprasis
- Species: C. quadrimaculata

Binomial name
- Chrysoprasis quadrimaculata Gounelle, 1913

Species of beetle

Chrysoprasis quadrimaculata is a species of beetle in the family Cerambycidae. It was described by Gounelle in 1913.
