= Chrysoprasis seticornis =

Scientific classification
- Kingdom: Animalia
- Phylum: Arthropoda
- Clade: Pancrustacea
- Class: Insecta
- Order: Coleoptera
- Suborder: Polyphaga
- Infraorder: Cucujiformia
- Family: Cerambycidae
- Genus: Chrysoprasis
- Species: C. seticornis

Binomial name
- Chrysoprasis seticornis Bates, 1880

Species of beetle

Chrysoprasis seticornis is a species of beetle in the family Cerambycidae. It was described by Henry Walter Bates in 1880. It is found in Nicaragua and Costa Rica.
