= Pseudothonalmus woodleyi =

Scientific classification
- Kingdom: Animalia
- Phylum: Arthropoda
- Class: Insecta
- Order: Coleoptera
- Suborder: Polyphaga
- Infraorder: Cucujiformia
- Family: Cerambycidae
- Genus: Pseudothonalmus
- Species: P. woodleyi

Binomial name
- Pseudothonalmus woodleyi Lingafelter, Micheli & Guerrero, 2004

Species of beetle

Pseudothonalmus woodleyi is a species of beetle in the family Cerambycidae. It was described by Lingafelter, Micheli and Hugh in 2004.
