= Chrysoprasis collaris =

Scientific classification
- Kingdom: Animalia
- Phylum: Arthropoda
- Class: Insecta
- Order: Coleoptera
- Suborder: Polyphaga
- Infraorder: Cucujiformia
- Family: Cerambycidae
- Genus: Chrysoprasis
- Species: C. collaris

Binomial name
- Chrysoprasis collaris Chevrolat, 1859

Species of beetle

Chrysoprasis collaris is a species of beetle in the family Cerambycidae. It was described by Chevrolat in 1859.
