= Plectrocerum cribratum =

Scientific classification
- Kingdom: Animalia
- Phylum: Arthropoda
- Class: Insecta
- Order: Coleoptera
- Suborder: Polyphaga
- Infraorder: Cucujiformia
- Family: Cerambycidae
- Genus: Plectrocerum
- Species: P. cribratum

Binomial name
- Plectrocerum cribratum Sallé, 1856

Species of beetle

Plectrocerum cribratum is a species of beetle in the family Cerambycidae. It was described by Sallé in 1856.
