= Chrysoprasis nitidisternis =

Scientific classification
- Kingdom: Animalia
- Phylum: Arthropoda
- Clade: Pancrustacea
- Class: Insecta
- Order: Coleoptera
- Suborder: Polyphaga
- Infraorder: Cucujiformia
- Family: Cerambycidae
- Genus: Chrysoprasis
- Species: C. nitidisternis

Binomial name
- Chrysoprasis nitidisternis Zajciw, 1960

Species of beetle

Chrysoprasis nitidisternis is a species of beetle in the family Cerambycidae. It was described by Zajciw in 1960. It is found in Brazil (Ceará, Paraíba).
