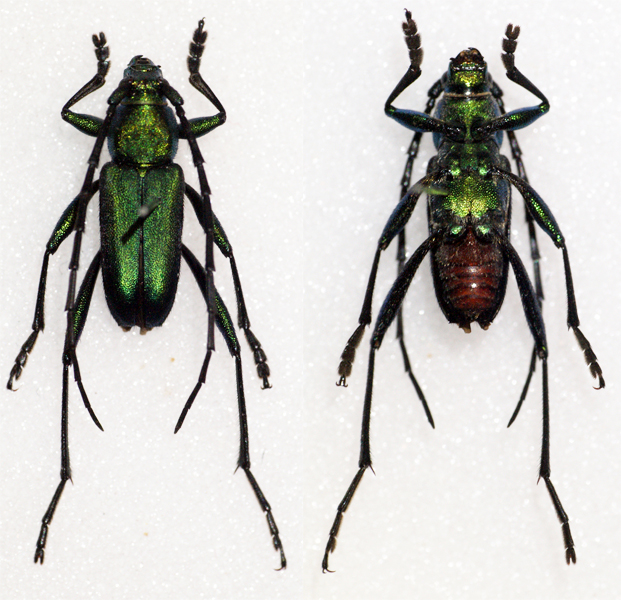

Scientific classification
- Kingdom: Animalia
- Phylum: Arthropoda
- Clade: Pancrustacea
- Class: Insecta
- Order: Coleoptera
- Suborder: Polyphaga
- Infraorder: Cucujiformia
- Family: Cerambycidae
- Genus: Chrysoprasis
- Species: C. hypocrita

Binomial name
- Chrysoprasis hypocrita Erichson, 1847

= Chrysoprasis hypocrita =

Species of beetle

Chrysoprasis hypocrita is a species of beetle in the family Cerambycidae (longhorn beetles). It was first described by the German entomologist Wilhelm Ferdinand Erichson in 1847.

== Description ==
Chrysoprasis hypocrita is a brightly colored and metallic beetle.

== Distribution ==
It is found in Mexico (Jalisco, Guerrero, Colima), Honduras, Nicaragua, Panama, Colombia, Ecuador, Venezuela, Peru, Bolivia, Brazil (Amazonas, Pará, Rondônia, Mato Grosso, Mato Grosso do Sul, Bahia, Minas Gerais, Espírito Santo, Rio de Janeiro, São Paulo, Paraná, Santa Catarina, Rio Grande do Sul), Paraguay, Argentina (Jujuy, Tucumán, Misiones) and Uruguay.
