= Chrysoprasis sobrina =

Scientific classification
- Kingdom: Animalia
- Phylum: Arthropoda
- Clade: Pancrustacea
- Class: Insecta
- Order: Coleoptera
- Suborder: Polyphaga
- Infraorder: Cucujiformia
- Family: Cerambycidae
- Genus: Chrysoprasis
- Species: C. sobrina

Binomial name
- Chrysoprasis sobrina Bates, 1870

Species of beetle

Chrysoprasis sobrina is a species of beetle in the family Cerambycidae. It was described by Bates in 1870. It is found in Ecuador, Venezuela, Peru, Bolivia, and Brazil (Amazonas, Pará, Rondônia, Mato Grosso, Bahia, Minas Gerais).
