= Amoaba =

Amoaba plumosa

Scientific classification
- Kingdom: Animalia
- Phylum: Arthropoda
- Class: Insecta
- Order: Coleoptera
- Suborder: Polyphaga
- Infraorder: Cucujiformia
- Family: Cerambycidae
- Genus: Amoaba
- Species: A. plumosa

Binomial name
- Amoaba plumosa Napp & Martins, 2006

Species of beetle

Amoaba plumosa is a species of beetle in the family Cerambycidae, the only species in the genus Amoaba.
