= Plectrocerum =

Scientific classification
- Kingdom: Animalia
- Phylum: Arthropoda
- Class: Insecta
- Order: Coleoptera
- Suborder: Polyphaga
- Infraorder: Cucujiformia
- Family: Cerambycidae
- Tribe: Heteropsini
- Genus: Plectrocerum

Genus of beetles

Plectrocerum is a genus of beetles in the family Cerambycidae, containing the following species:

- Plectrocerum cribratum Sallé, 1856
- Plectrocerum spinicorne (Olivier, 1795)
