= Stratone =

Scientific classification
- Domain: Eukaryota
- Kingdom: Animalia
- Phylum: Arthropoda
- Class: Insecta
- Order: Coleoptera
- Suborder: Polyphaga
- Infraorder: Cucujiformia
- Family: Cerambycidae
- Tribe: Heteropsini
- Genus: Stratone

Genus of beetles

Stratone is a genus of beetles in the family Cerambycidae, containing the following species:

- Stratone aurantia Galileo & Martins, 1992
- Stratone rufotestacea Thomson, 1864
- Stratone transversalis (Chevrolat, 1862)
