= Mallosoma =

Scientific classification
- Kingdom: Animalia
- Phylum: Arthropoda
- Class: Insecta
- Order: Coleoptera
- Suborder: Polyphaga
- Infraorder: Cucujiformia
- Family: Cerambycidae
- Tribe: Heteropsini
- Genus: Mallosoma

Genus of beetles

Mallosoma is a genus of beetles in the family Cerambycidae, containing the following species:

- Mallosoma piptadeniae Giacomel, 1976
- Mallosoma scutellare White, 1853
- Mallosoma zonatum (Sahlberg, 1823)
