= Unatara =

Unatara atinga

Scientific classification
- Kingdom: Animalia
- Phylum: Arthropoda
- Class: Insecta
- Order: Coleoptera
- Suborder: Polyphaga
- Infraorder: Cucujiformia
- Family: Cerambycidae
- Genus: Unatara
- Species: U. atinga

Binomial name
- Unatara atinga Martins & Napp, 2007

Species of beetle

Unatara atinga is a species of beetle in the family Cerambycidae, the only species in the genus Unatara.
