= Pseudothonalmus =

Scientific classification
- Kingdom: Animalia
- Phylum: Arthropoda
- Class: Insecta
- Order: Coleoptera
- Suborder: Polyphaga
- Infraorder: Cucujiformia
- Family: Cerambycidae
- Tribe: Heteropsini
- Genus: Pseudothonalmus

Genus of beetles

Pseudothonalmus is a genus of beetles in the family Cerambycidae, containing the following species:

- Pseudothonalmus divisus (Chevrolat, 1858)
- Pseudothonalmus major (Gahan, 1895)
- Pseudothonalmus terminalis (White, 1853)
- Pseudothonalmus woodleyi Lingafelter, Micheli & Guerrero, 2004
