= Potisangaba =

Potisangaba panama

Scientific classification
- Kingdom: Animalia
- Phylum: Arthropoda
- Class: Insecta
- Order: Coleoptera
- Suborder: Polyphaga
- Infraorder: Cucujiformia
- Family: Cerambycidae
- Genus: Potisangaba
- Species: P. panama

Binomial name
- Potisangaba panama Napp & Martins, 2009

Species of beetle

Potisangaba Panama is a species of beetle in the family Cerambycidae, the only species in the genus Potisangaba.
