= Purpuricenopsis =

Purpuricenopsis humeralis

Scientific classification
- Kingdom: Animalia
- Phylum: Arthropoda
- Class: Insecta
- Order: Coleoptera
- Suborder: Polyphaga
- Infraorder: Cucujiformia
- Family: Cerambycidae
- Genus: Purpuricenopsis
- Species: P. humeralis

Binomial name
- Purpuricenopsis humeralis Zajciw, 1968

Species of beetle

Purpuricenopsis humeralis is a species of beetle in the family Cerambycidae, the only species in the genus Purpuricenopsis.
