= Allodemus =

Scientific classification
- Kingdom: Animalia
- Phylum: Arthropoda
- Class: Insecta
- Order: Coleoptera
- Suborder: Polyphaga
- Infraorder: Cucujiformia
- Family: Cerambycidae
- Tribe: Heteropsini
- Genus: Allodemus

Genus of beetles

Allodemus is a genus of beetles in the family Cerambycidae, containing the following species:

- Allodemus centromaculatus Zajciw, 1968
- Allodemus tricolor (Perty, 1832)
