= Tacyba =

Tacyba tenuis

Scientific classification
- Kingdom: Animalia
- Phylum: Arthropoda
- Class: Insecta
- Order: Coleoptera
- Suborder: Polyphaga
- Infraorder: Cucujiformia
- Family: Cerambycidae
- Genus: Tacyba
- Species: T. tenuis

Binomial name
- Tacyba tenuis (Blanchard in Gay, 1851)

Species of beetle

Tacyba tenuis is a species of beetle in the family Cerambycidae, the only species in the genus Tacyba.
