= Eryphus =

Scientific classification
- Kingdom: Animalia
- Phylum: Arthropoda
- Class: Insecta
- Order: Coleoptera
- Suborder: Polyphaga
- Infraorder: Cucujiformia
- Family: Cerambycidae
- Tribe: Heteropsini
- Genus: Eryphus

Genus of beetles

Eryphus is a genus of beetles in the family Cerambycidae, containing the following species:

- Eryphus bipunctatus (Perty, 1832)
- Eryphus bivittatus (Melzer, 1934)
- Eryphus carinatus (Zajciw, 1970)
- Eryphus carioca Napp & Martins, 2002
- Eryphus flavicollis (Fisher, 1938)
- Eryphus laetus (Blanchard in Gay, 1851)
- Eryphus marginatus (Zajciw, 1970)
- Eryphus picticollis (Gounelle, 1911)
- Eryphus tacuarembo Napp & Martins, 2002
- Eryphus transversalis (Fairmaire & Germain, 1864)
