= Unabiara =

Unabiara collaris

Scientific classification
- Kingdom: Animalia
- Phylum: Arthropoda
- Class: Insecta
- Order: Coleoptera
- Suborder: Polyphaga
- Infraorder: Cucujiformia
- Family: Cerambycidae
- Genus: Unabiara
- Species: U. collaris

Binomial name
- Unabiara collaris (Philippi & Philippi, 1864)

Species of beetle

Unabiara collaris is a species of beetle in the family Cerambycidae, the only species in the genus Unabiara.
