= Eupempelus =

Scientific classification
- Domain: Eukaryota
- Kingdom: Animalia
- Phylum: Arthropoda
- Class: Insecta
- Order: Coleoptera
- Suborder: Polyphaga
- Infraorder: Cucujiformia
- Family: Cerambycidae
- Tribe: Heteropsini
- Genus: Eupempelus

Genus of beetles

Eupempelus is a genus of beetles in the family Cerambycidae, containing the following species:

- Eupempelus illuminus Mermudes & Napp, 2001
- Eupempelus olivaceus Bates, 1870
- Eupempelus spinithorax Mermudes & Napp, 2001
