= Callideriphus =

Scientific classification
- Domain: Eukaryota
- Kingdom: Animalia
- Phylum: Arthropoda
- Class: Insecta
- Order: Coleoptera
- Suborder: Polyphaga
- Infraorder: Cucujiformia
- Family: Cerambycidae
- Tribe: Heteropsini
- Genus: Callideriphus

Genus of beetles

Callideriphus is a genus of beetles in the family Cerambycidae, containing the following species:

- Callideriphus grossipes Blanchard in Gay, 1851
- Callideriphus tucumanus Napp & Martins, 2002
