= Monnecles =

Monnecles apollinarii

Scientific classification
- Kingdom: Animalia
- Phylum: Arthropoda
- Class: Insecta
- Order: Coleoptera
- Suborder: Polyphaga
- Infraorder: Cucujiformia
- Family: Cerambycidae
- Genus: Monnecles
- Species: M. apollinarii

Binomial name
- Monnecles apollinarii (Gounelle, 1913)

Species of beetle

Monnecles apollinarii is a species of beetle in the family Cerambycidae, the only species in the genus Monnecles.
