= Poeciloderma =

Poeciloderma sexfasciatum

Scientific classification
- Kingdom: Animalia
- Phylum: Arthropoda
- Class: Insecta
- Order: Coleoptera
- Suborder: Polyphaga
- Infraorder: Cucujiformia
- Family: Cerambycidae
- Genus: Poeciloderma
- Species: P. sexfasciatum

Binomial name
- Poeciloderma sexfasciatum (Olivier, 1790)

Synonyms
- Callidum sex-fasciatum Olivier, 1790

Species of beetle

Poeciloderma sexfasciatum is a species of beetle in the family Cerambycidae, the only species in the genus Poeciloderma.
