= Neopoeciloderma =

Neopoeciloderma lepturoides

Scientific classification
- Kingdom: Animalia
- Phylum: Arthropoda
- Class: Insecta
- Order: Coleoptera
- Suborder: Polyphaga
- Infraorder: Cucujiformia
- Family: Cerambycidae
- Genus: Neopoeciloderma
- Species: N. lepturoides

Binomial name
- Neopoeciloderma lepturoides (Jacquelin du Val in Sagra, 1857)

Species of beetle

Neopoeciloderma lepturoides is a species of beetle in the family Cerambycidae, the only species in the genus Neopoeciloderma.
