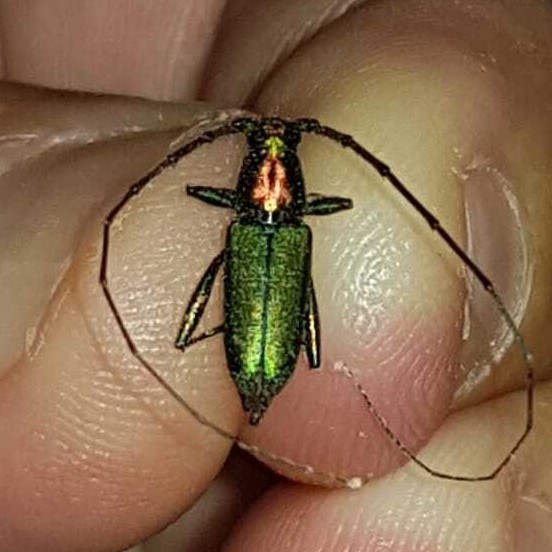
- Topipuranga chlorogaster

Scientific classification
- Kingdom: Animalia
- Phylum: Arthropoda
- Clade: Pancrustacea
- Class: Insecta
- Order: Coleoptera
- Suborder: Polyphaga
- Infraorder: Cucujiformia
- Family: Cerambycidae
- Tribe: Heteropsini
- Genus: Tobipuranga; Napp & Martins, 1996

= Tobipuranga =

Genus of beetles

Tobipuranga is a genus of beetles in the family Cerambycidae, containing the following species:

- Tobipuranga aspera Martins, Galileo & Santos-Silva, 2015
- Tobipuranga auricollis (Dalman in Schoenherr, 1817)
- Tobipuranga auripes (Bates, 1870)
- Tobipuranga belti (Bates, 1872)
- Tobipuranga chlorogaster (Aurivillius, 1910)
- Tobipuranga ignea (Bates, 1870)
- Tobipuranga longicornis (Bates, 1870)
- Tobipuranga ruficoxis (Bates, 1870)
- Tobipuranga ybyra Napp & Martins, 1996
