= Championa =

Scientific classification
- Kingdom: Animalia
- Phylum: Arthropoda
- Class: Insecta
- Order: Coleoptera
- Suborder: Polyphaga
- Infraorder: Cucujiformia
- Family: Cerambycidae
- Tribe: Heteropsini
- Genus: Championa; Bates, 1880

Type species
- Championa aurata Bates, 1880

Genus of beetles

Championa is a genus of beetles in the family Cerambycidae, containing the following species:

- Championa aliciae Noguera & Chemsak, 1997
- Championa aurata Bates, 1880
- Championa badeni Bates, 1892
- Championa chemsaki Martins & Napp, 1992
- Championa chihuahuaensis Heffern, Santos-Silva & Nascimento, 2021
- Championa ctenostomoides Bates, 1885
- Championa elegans Chemsak, 1967
- Championa santossilvai Bezark, 2019
- Championa suturalis Chemsak, 1967
- Championa westcotti Noguera & Chemsak, 1997
- Championa zaragozai Heffern, Santos-Silva & Nascimento, 2021
