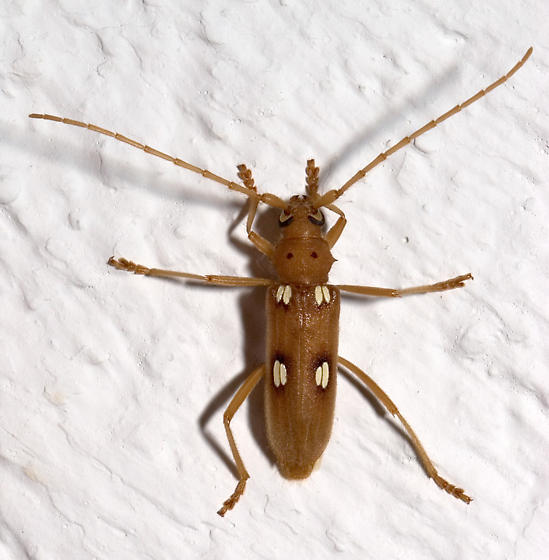
- Eburia quadrigeminata

Scientific classification
- Kingdom: Animalia
- Phylum: Arthropoda
- Class: Insecta
- Order: Coleoptera
- Suborder: Polyphaga
- Infraorder: Cucujiformia
- Family: Cerambycidae
- Subfamily: Cerambycinae
- Tribe: Eburiini; Blanchard, 1845

Synonyms
- Eburiides Lacordaire, 1869; Eburiinae Bates, 1870; Eburiitas Blanchard in Gay, 1851; Eburiites Blanchard, 1845; Eburitae Thomson, 1860; Hétéropsides Lacordaire, 1869; Heteropsinae Bates, 1870; Heteropsini Lacordaire, 1869

= Eburiini =

Tribe of beetles

Eburiini is a tribe of beetles in the subfamily Cerambycinae, synonymous with the tribe Heteropsini Lacordaire, 1868, containing the following genera:

- Beraba Martins, 1997
- Cupanoscelis Gounelle, 1909
- Dioridium Zajciw, 1961
- Eburella Monné & Martins, 1973
- Eburia Lacordaire, 1830
- Eburiaca Martins, 2000
- Eburiola Thomson, 1864
- Eburodacrys White, 1853
- Eburodacrystola Melzer, 1928
- Eburostola Tippmann, 1960
- Eleutho Thomson, 1864
- Erosida Thomson, 1861
- Heterops Blanchard, 1842
- Neoeburia Galileo & Martins, 2006
- Pantomallus Lacordaire, 1868
- = Opades Lacordaire, 1868 syn. nov.
  - Pantomallus costipennis (Buquet, 1844) comb. nov.
  - Pantomallus fuligineus Bates, 1872 resurrection of the original combination
  - Pantomallus sordidus Burmeister, 1865 comb. nov.
- Pronuba Thomson, 1861
- Quiacaua Martins, 1997
- Simplexeburia Martins & Galileo, 2010
- Solangella Martins, 1997
- Styliceps Lacordaire, 1868
- Susuacanga Martins, 1997
- Tumiditarsus Zajciw, 1961
- Uncieburia Martins, 1997
- Volxemia Lameere, 1884
