= Pronuba =

Pronuba is a Latin term meaning "for the bride" and may refer to:

- A Roman bride's matron of honour; also an honorific for certain female deities thought to preside at Roman weddings — see Marriage in ancient Rome and Genius (mythology)
- Pronuba (beetle), a beetle genus
