= Pronuba incognita =

Scientific classification
- Domain: Eukaryota
- Kingdom: Animalia
- Phylum: Arthropoda
- Class: Insecta
- Order: Coleoptera
- Suborder: Polyphaga
- Infraorder: Cucujiformia
- Family: Cerambycidae
- Subfamily: Cerambycinae
- Tribe: Eburiini
- Genus: Pronuba
- Species: P. incognita

Binomial name
- Pronuba incognita Hovore & Giesbert, 1990

Species of beetle

Pronuba incognita is a species of long-horned beetle in the family Cerambycidae. It is found in Costa Rica, Honduras, and Panama.
