= Pronuba dorilis =

Scientific classification
- Domain: Eukaryota
- Kingdom: Animalia
- Phylum: Arthropoda
- Class: Insecta
- Order: Coleoptera
- Suborder: Polyphaga
- Infraorder: Cucujiformia
- Family: Cerambycidae
- Subfamily: Cerambycinae
- Tribe: Eburiini
- Genus: Pronuba
- Species: P. dorilis

Binomial name
- Pronuba dorilis (Bates, 1867)

Synonyms
- Microspiloma dorilis Gemminger & Harold, 1872

Species of beetle

Pronuba dorilis is a species of long-horned beetle in the family Cerambycidae. It is found in Bolivia, Brazil, and Ecuador.
