= Trichrous =

Scientific classification
- Domain: Eukaryota
- Kingdom: Animalia
- Phylum: Arthropoda
- Class: Insecta
- Order: Coleoptera
- Suborder: Polyphaga
- Infraorder: Cucujiformia
- Family: Cerambycidae
- Tribe: Heteropsini
- Genus: Trichrous

Genus of beetles

Trichrous is a genus of beetles in the family Cerambycidae, containing the following species:

- Trichrous basalis (White, 1853)
- Trichrous bicolor (Sallé, 1856)
- Trichrous brevicornis Zayas, 1975
- Trichrous dimidiatipennis (Chevrolat, 1838)
- Trichrous fisheri Monné & Giesbert, 1992
- Trichrous irroratus (Olivier, 1795)
- Trichrous jaegeri Chevrolat, 1858
- Trichrous jamaicensis Chevrolat, 1858
- Trichrous lineolatus (White, 1853)
- Trichrous nigripes Fisher, 1942
- Trichrous pilipennis Chevrolat, 1862
- Trichrous prasinus Cazier & Lacey, 1952
- Trichrous violaceipennis Fisher, 1942
- Trichrous vittatus Fisher, 1932
