= Pronuba lenkoi =

Scientific classification
- Domain: Eukaryota
- Kingdom: Animalia
- Phylum: Arthropoda
- Class: Insecta
- Order: Coleoptera
- Suborder: Polyphaga
- Infraorder: Cucujiformia
- Family: Cerambycidae
- Subfamily: Cerambycinae
- Tribe: Eburiini
- Genus: Pronuba
- Species: P. lenkoi

Binomial name
- Pronuba lenkoi Monné & Martins, 1974

Species of beetle

Pronuba lenkoi is a species of long-horned beetle in the family Cerambycidae. It is found in Brazil and Bolivia.
