= Erosida delia =

Scientific classification
- Kingdom: Animalia
- Phylum: Arthropoda
- Class: Insecta
- Order: Coleoptera
- Suborder: Polyphaga
- Infraorder: Cucujiformia
- Family: Cerambycidae
- Genus: Erosida
- Species: E. delia

Binomial name
- Erosida delia Thomson, 1860

Synonyms
- Erosida elegans (Lacordaire, 1869)

Species of beetle

Erosida delia is a species of beetle in the family Cerambycidae. It was described by Thomson in 1860.
