= Volxemia seabrai =

Scientific classification
- Kingdom: Animalia
- Phylum: Arthropoda
- Class: Insecta
- Order: Coleoptera
- Suborder: Polyphaga
- Infraorder: Cucujiformia
- Family: Cerambycidae
- Genus: Volxemia
- Species: V. seabrai

Binomial name
- Volxemia seabrai Zajciw, 1968

Species of beetle

Volxemia seabrai is a species of beetle in the family Cerambycidae. It was described by Zajciw in 1968.
