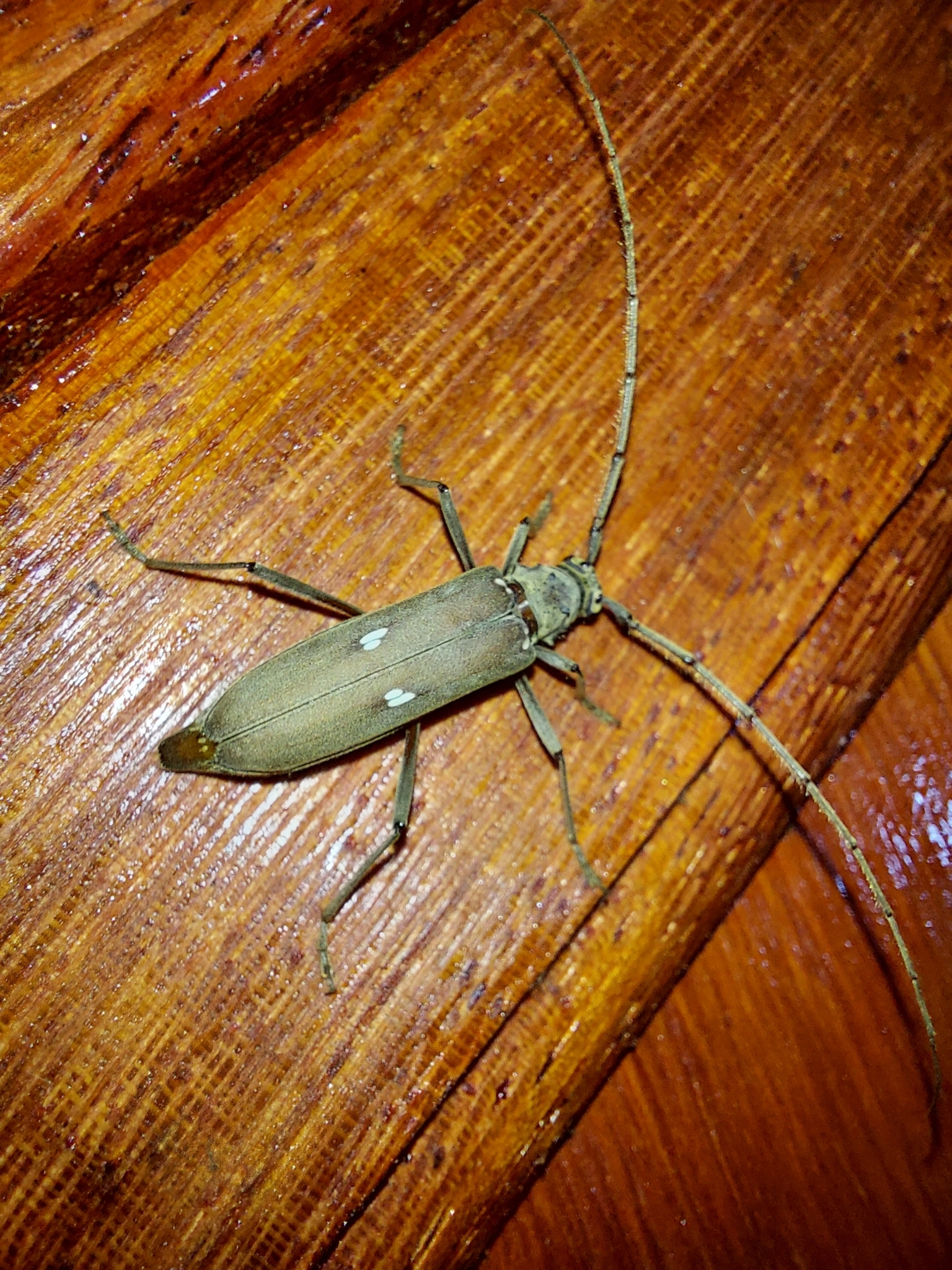

Scientific classification
- Domain: Eukaryota
- Kingdom: Animalia
- Phylum: Arthropoda
- Class: Insecta
- Order: Coleoptera
- Suborder: Polyphaga
- Infraorder: Cucujiformia
- Family: Cerambycidae
- Genus: Susuacanga
- Species: S. octoguttata

Binomial name
- Susuacanga octoguttata (Germar, 1821)

= Susuacanga octoguttata =

Species of beetle

Susuacanga octoguttata is a species of beetle in the family Cerambycidae. It was described by Ernst Friedrich Germar in 1821.
