= Pantomallus martinezi =

Scientific classification
- Kingdom: Animalia
- Phylum: Arthropoda
- Class: Insecta
- Order: Coleoptera
- Suborder: Polyphaga
- Infraorder: Cucujiformia
- Family: Cerambycidae
- Genus: Pantomallus
- Species: P. martinezi

Binomial name
- Pantomallus martinezi Martins & Galileo, 2002

Species of beetle

Pantomallus martinezi is a species of beetle in the family Cerambycidae. It was described by Martins and Galileo in 2002.
