= Trichrous prasinus =

Scientific classification
- Kingdom: Animalia
- Phylum: Arthropoda
- Class: Insecta
- Order: Coleoptera
- Suborder: Polyphaga
- Infraorder: Cucujiformia
- Family: Cerambycidae
- Genus: Trichrous
- Species: T. prasinus

Binomial name
- Trichrous prasinus Cazier & Lacey, 1952

Species of beetle

Trichrous prasinus is a species of beetle in the family Cerambycidae. It was described by Cazier and Lacey in 1952.
