= Eburella pinima =

Scientific classification
- Kingdom: Animalia
- Phylum: Arthropoda
- Class: Insecta
- Order: Coleoptera
- Suborder: Polyphaga
- Infraorder: Cucujiformia
- Family: Cerambycidae
- Genus: Eburella
- Species: E. pinima

Binomial name
- Eburella pinima Martins, 1997

Species of beetle

Eburella pinima is a species of beetle in the family Cerambycidae.
