= Trichrous violaceipennis =

Scientific classification
- Domain: Eukaryota
- Kingdom: Animalia
- Phylum: Arthropoda
- Class: Insecta
- Order: Coleoptera
- Suborder: Polyphaga
- Infraorder: Cucujiformia
- Family: Cerambycidae
- Genus: Trichrous
- Species: T. violaceipennis

Binomial name
- Trichrous violaceipennis Fisher, 1942

Species of beetle

Trichrous violaceipennis is a species of beetle in the family Cerambycidae. It was described by Fisher in 1942.
