= Cupanoscelis inermis =

Scientific classification
- Kingdom: Animalia
- Phylum: Arthropoda
- Class: Insecta
- Order: Coleoptera
- Suborder: Polyphaga
- Infraorder: Cucujiformia
- Family: Cerambycidae
- Genus: Cupanoscelis
- Species: C. inermis

Binomial name
- Cupanoscelis inermis Martins & Monné, 1992

Species of beetle

Cupanoscelis inermis is a species of beetle in the family Cerambycidae.
