= Pantomallus piruatinga =

Scientific classification
- Kingdom: Animalia
- Phylum: Arthropoda
- Class: Insecta
- Order: Coleoptera
- Suborder: Polyphaga
- Infraorder: Cucujiformia
- Family: Cerambycidae
- Genus: Pantomallus
- Species: P. piruatinga

Binomial name
- Pantomallus piruatinga Martins, 1997

Species of beetle

Pantomallus piruatinga is a species of beetle in the family Cerambycidae. It was described by Martins in 1997.
