= Pantomallus pallidus =

Scientific classification
- Kingdom: Animalia
- Phylum: Arthropoda
- Class: Insecta
- Order: Coleoptera
- Suborder: Polyphaga
- Infraorder: Cucujiformia
- Family: Cerambycidae
- Genus: Pantomallus
- Species: P. pallidus

Binomial name
- Pantomallus pallidus Aurivillius, 1923

Species of beetle

Pantomallus pallidus is a species of beetle in the family Cerambycidae. It was described by Per Olof Christopher Aurivillius in 1923.
