= Susuacanga maculicornis =

Scientific classification
- Domain: Eukaryota
- Kingdom: Animalia
- Phylum: Arthropoda
- Class: Insecta
- Order: Coleoptera
- Suborder: Polyphaga
- Infraorder: Cucujiformia
- Family: Cerambycidae
- Genus: Susuacanga
- Species: S. maculicornis

Binomial name
- Susuacanga maculicornis (Bates, 1870)

Synonyms
- Eburia maculicornis (Bates, 1870)

Species of beetle

Susuacanga maculicornis is a species of beetle in the family Cerambycidae. It was described by Bates in 1870.
