= Uncieburia rogersi =

Scientific classification
- Kingdom: Animalia
- Phylum: Arthropoda
- Class: Insecta
- Order: Coleoptera
- Suborder: Polyphaga
- Infraorder: Cucujiformia
- Family: Cerambycidae
- Genus: Uncieburia
- Species: U. rogersi

Binomial name
- Uncieburia rogersi (Bates, 1870)

Synonyms
- Eburia rogersi (Bates, 1870); Eburia subcornuta (Fuchs, 1955)

Species of beetle

Uncieburia rogersi is a species of beetle in the family Cerambycidae. It was described by Bates in 1870.
