= Heterops bipartitus =

Scientific classification
- Domain: Eukaryota
- Kingdom: Animalia
- Phylum: Arthropoda
- Class: Insecta
- Order: Coleoptera
- Suborder: Polyphaga
- Infraorder: Cucujiformia
- Family: Cerambycidae
- Genus: Heterops
- Species: H. bipartitus

Binomial name
- Heterops bipartitus Lacordaire, 1869

Species of beetle

Heterops bipartitus is a species of beetle in the family Cerambycidae. It was described by Lacordaire in 1869.
