= Dioridium borgmeieri =

Scientific classification
- Kingdom: Animalia
- Phylum: Arthropoda
- Class: Insecta
- Order: Coleoptera
- Suborder: Polyphaga
- Infraorder: Cucujiformia
- Family: Cerambycidae
- Genus: Dioridium
- Species: D. borgmeieri

Binomial name
- Dioridium borgmeieri Lane, 1972

Species of beetle

Dioridium borgmeieri is a species of beetle in the family Cerambycidae.
