= Solangella micromacula =

Scientific classification
- Kingdom: Animalia
- Phylum: Arthropoda
- Class: Insecta
- Order: Coleoptera
- Suborder: Polyphaga
- Infraorder: Cucujiformia
- Family: Cerambycidae
- Genus: Solangella
- Species: S. micromacula

Binomial name
- Solangella micromacula Martins, 1997

Species of beetle

Solangella micromacula is a species of beetle in the family Cerambycidae. It was described by Martins in 1997.
