= Erosida yucatana =

Scientific classification
- Kingdom: Animalia
- Phylum: Arthropoda
- Class: Insecta
- Order: Coleoptera
- Suborder: Polyphaga
- Infraorder: Cucujiformia
- Family: Cerambycidae
- Genus: Erosida
- Species: E. yucatana

Binomial name
- Erosida yucatana Giesbert, 1985

Species of beetle

Erosida yucatana is a species of beetle in the family Cerambycidae. It was described by Giesbert in 1985.
