= Erosida lineola =

Scientific classification
- Kingdom: Animalia
- Phylum: Arthropoda
- Class: Insecta
- Order: Coleoptera
- Suborder: Polyphaga
- Infraorder: Cucujiformia
- Family: Cerambycidae
- Genus: Erosida
- Species: E. lineola

Binomial name
- Erosida lineola (Fabricius, 1781)

Species of beetle

Erosida lineola is a species of beetle in the family Cerambycidae. It was described by Johan Christian Fabricius in 1781.
