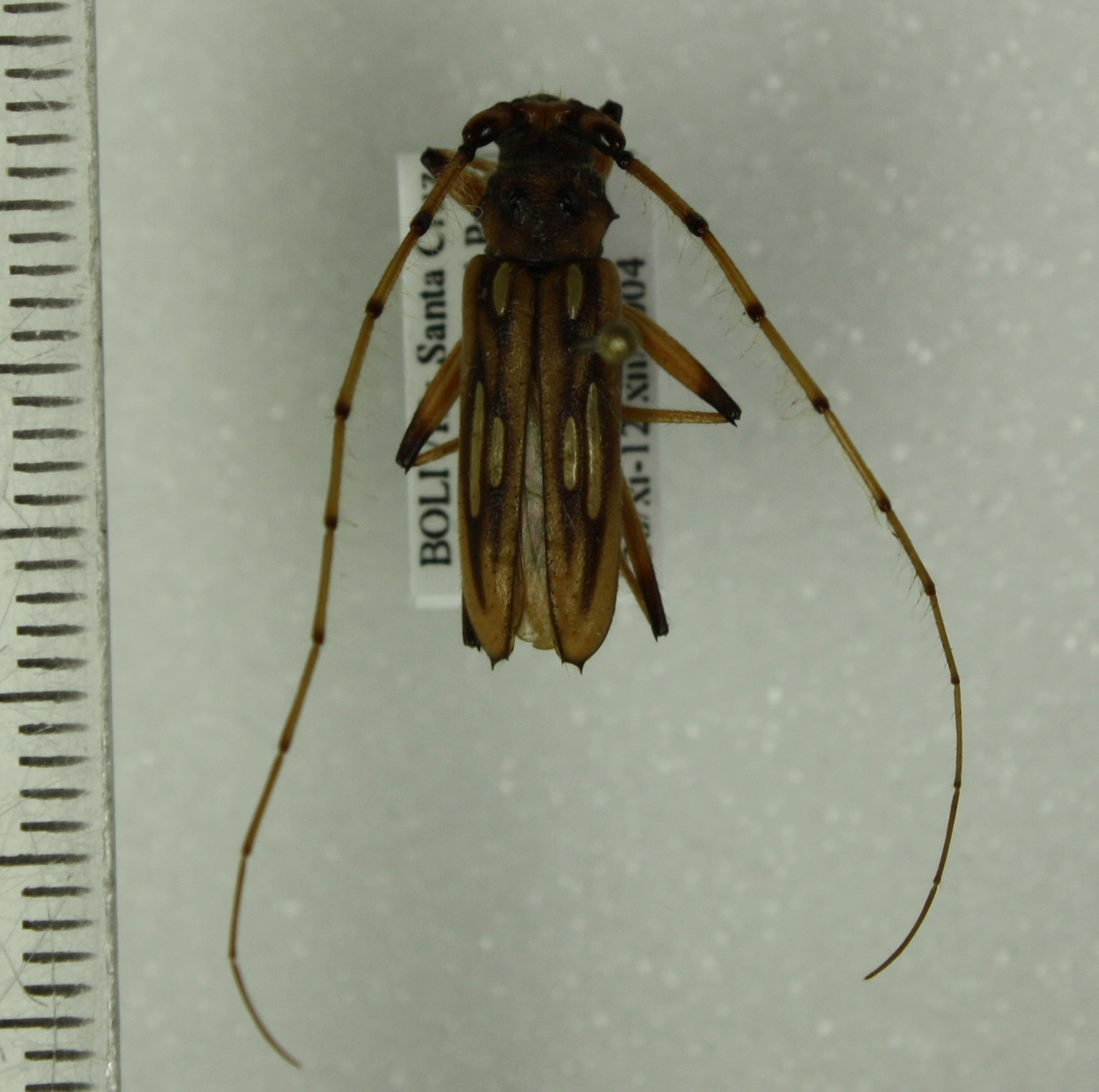

Scientific classification
- Kingdom: Animalia
- Phylum: Arthropoda
- Class: Insecta
- Order: Coleoptera
- Suborder: Polyphaga
- Infraorder: Cucujiformia
- Family: Cerambycidae
- Genus: Uncieburia
- Species: U. nigricans

Binomial name
- Uncieburia nigricans (Gounelle, 1909)

= Uncieburia nigricans =

Species of beetle

Uncieburia nigricans is a species of beetle in the family Cerambycidae. It was described by Gounelle in 1909.
