= Pantomallus reclusus =

Scientific classification
- Kingdom: Animalia
- Phylum: Arthropoda
- Class: Insecta
- Order: Coleoptera
- Suborder: Polyphaga
- Infraorder: Cucujiformia
- Family: Cerambycidae
- Genus: Pantomallus
- Species: P. reclusus

Binomial name
- Pantomallus reclusus (Martins, 1981)

Species of beetle

Pantomallus reclusus is a species of beetle in the family Cerambycidae. It was described by Martins in 1981.
