= Solangella meridana =

Scientific classification
- Kingdom: Animalia
- Phylum: Arthropoda
- Class: Insecta
- Order: Coleoptera
- Suborder: Polyphaga
- Infraorder: Cucujiformia
- Family: Cerambycidae
- Genus: Solangella
- Species: S. meridana

Binomial name
- Solangella meridana Bates, 1872

Synonyms
- Eburia meridana (Monné, 1993); Pantomallus meridanus (Bates, 1872)

Species of beetle

Solangella meridana is a species of beetle in the family Cerambycidae. It was described by Bates in 1872.
