= Trichrous brevicornis =

Scientific classification
- Domain: Eukaryota
- Kingdom: Animalia
- Phylum: Arthropoda
- Class: Insecta
- Order: Coleoptera
- Suborder: Polyphaga
- Infraorder: Cucujiformia
- Family: Cerambycidae
- Genus: Trichrous
- Species: T. brevicornis

Binomial name
- Trichrous brevicornis Zayas, 1975

Species of beetle

Trichrous brevicornis is a species of beetle in the family Cerambycidae. It was described by Zayas in 1975.
