= Trichrous jaegeri =

Scientific classification
- Domain: Eukaryota
- Kingdom: Animalia
- Phylum: Arthropoda
- Class: Insecta
- Order: Coleoptera
- Suborder: Polyphaga
- Infraorder: Cucujiformia
- Family: Cerambycidae
- Genus: Trichrous
- Species: T. jaegeri

Binomial name
- Trichrous jaegeri Chevrolat, 1858

Species of beetle

Trichrous jaegeri is a species of beetle in the family Cerambycidae. It was described by Chevrolat in 1858.
