= Cupanoscelis serrana =

Scientific classification
- Kingdom: Animalia
- Phylum: Arthropoda
- Class: Insecta
- Order: Coleoptera
- Suborder: Polyphaga
- Infraorder: Cucujiformia
- Family: Cerambycidae
- Genus: Cupanoscelis
- Species: C. serrana

Binomial name
- Cupanoscelis serrana Galileo & Martins, 1999

Species of beetle

Cupanoscelis serrana is a species of beetle in the family Cerambycidae.
