= Cupanoscelis clavipes =

Scientific classification
- Kingdom: Animalia
- Phylum: Arthropoda
- Class: Insecta
- Order: Coleoptera
- Suborder: Polyphaga
- Infraorder: Cucujiformia
- Family: Cerambycidae
- Genus: Cupanoscelis
- Species: C. clavipes

Binomial name
- Cupanoscelis clavipes Gounelle, 1909

Synonyms
- Eburodacrys clavipes (Gounelle, 1909)

Species of beetle

Cupanoscelis clavipes is a species of beetle in the family Cerambycidae.
