= Quiacaua taguaiba =

Scientific classification
- Kingdom: Animalia
- Phylum: Arthropoda
- Class: Insecta
- Order: Coleoptera
- Suborder: Polyphaga
- Infraorder: Cucujiformia
- Family: Cerambycidae
- Genus: Quiacaua
- Species: Q. taguaiba

Binomial name
- Quiacaua taguaiba Martins, 1997

Species of beetle

Quiacaua taguaiba is a species of beetle in the family Cerambycidae. It was described by Martins in 1997.
