= Heterops bicolor =

Scientific classification
- Domain: Eukaryota
- Kingdom: Animalia
- Phylum: Arthropoda
- Class: Insecta
- Order: Coleoptera
- Suborder: Polyphaga
- Infraorder: Cucujiformia
- Family: Cerambycidae
- Genus: Heterops
- Species: H. bicolor

Binomial name
- Heterops bicolor Fisher, 1936

Species of beetle

Heterops bicolor is a species of beetle in the family Cerambycidae. It was described by Fisher in 1936.
