= Eburella pumicosa =

Scientific classification
- Kingdom: Animalia
- Phylum: Arthropoda
- Class: Insecta
- Order: Coleoptera
- Suborder: Polyphaga
- Infraorder: Cucujiformia
- Family: Cerambycidae
- Genus: Eburella
- Species: E. pumicosa

Binomial name
- Eburella pumicosa Martins & Monné, 1973

Species of beetle

Eburella pumicosa is a species of beetle in the family Cerambycidae.
