= Heterops lanieri =

Scientific classification
- Domain: Eukaryota
- Kingdom: Animalia
- Phylum: Arthropoda
- Class: Insecta
- Order: Coleoptera
- Suborder: Polyphaga
- Infraorder: Cucujiformia
- Family: Cerambycidae
- Genus: Heterops
- Species: H. lanieri

Binomial name
- Heterops lanieri (Chevrolat, 1838)

Species of beetle

Heterops lanieri is a species of beetle in the family Cerambycidae. It was described by Chevrolat in 1838.
