= Erosida formosa =

Scientific classification
- Kingdom: Animalia
- Phylum: Arthropoda
- Class: Insecta
- Order: Coleoptera
- Suborder: Polyphaga
- Infraorder: Cucujiformia
- Family: Cerambycidae
- Genus: Erosida
- Species: E. formosa

Binomial name
- Erosida formosa (Blanchard, 1847)

Species of beetle

Erosida formosa is a species of beetle in the family Cerambycidae. It was described by Blanchard in 1847.
