= Pantomallus morosus =

Scientific classification
- Kingdom: Animalia
- Phylum: Arthropoda
- Clade: Pancrustacea
- Class: Insecta
- Order: Coleoptera
- Suborder: Polyphaga
- Infraorder: Cucujiformia
- Family: Cerambycidae
- Genus: Pantomallus
- Species: P. morosus

Binomial name
- Pantomallus morosus (Audinet-Serville, 1834)

Species of beetle

Pantomallus morosus is a species of beetle in the family Cerambycidae. It was described by Audinet-Serville in 1834. It is found in Brazil (Goiás, Piauí, Sergipe, Paraíba, Bahia, Minas Gerais, Espírito Santo, Rio de Janeiro, São Paulo, Paraná, Santa Catarina, Rio Grande do Sul), Paraguay, Uruguay and Argentina (Misiones).
