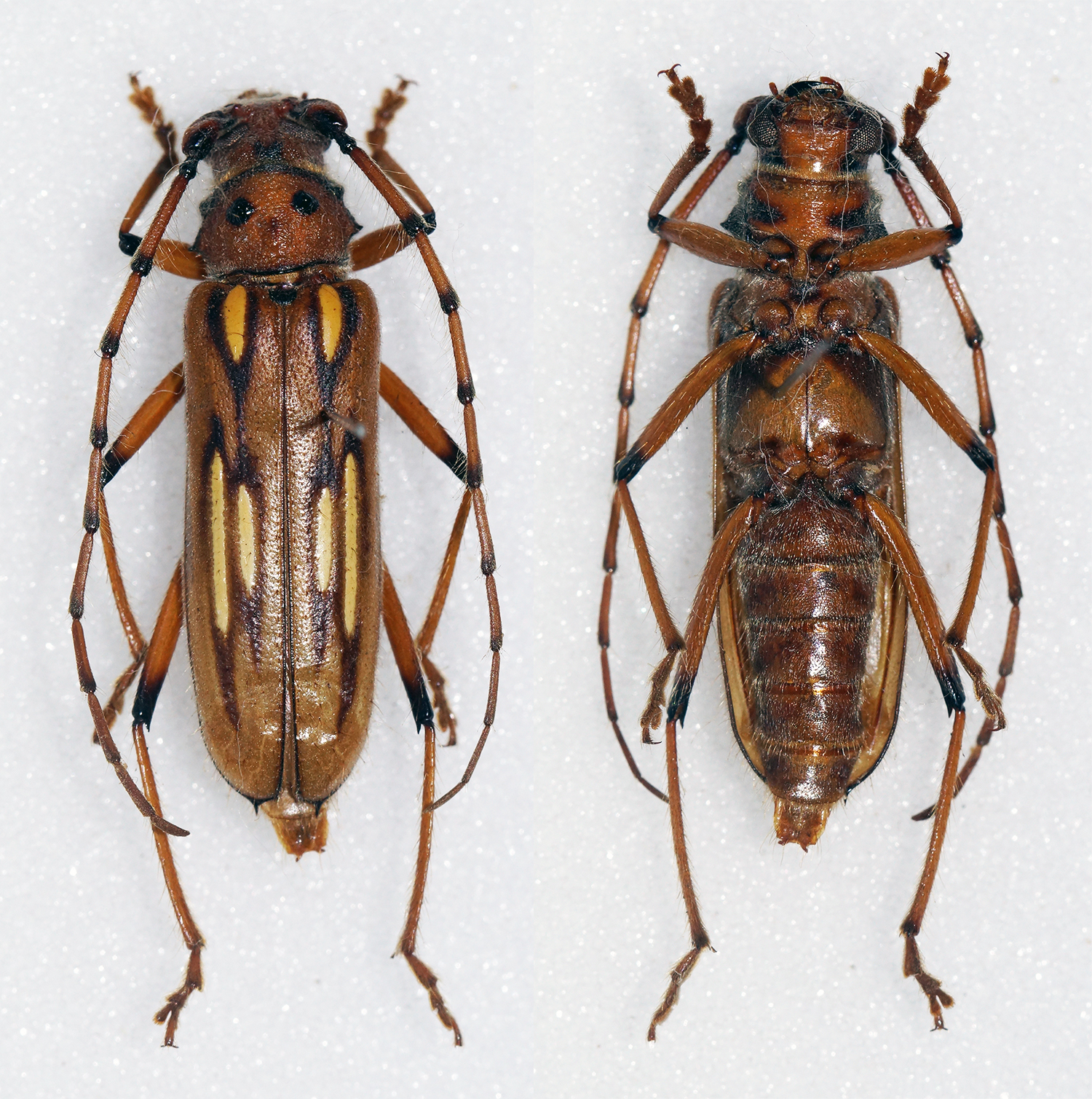

Scientific classification
- Kingdom: Animalia
- Phylum: Arthropoda
- Class: Insecta
- Order: Coleoptera
- Suborder: Polyphaga
- Infraorder: Cucujiformia
- Family: Cerambycidae
- Genus: Uncieburia
- Species: U. quadrilineata

Binomial name
- Uncieburia quadrilineata (Burmeister, 1865)

Synonyms
- Eburia quadrilineata (Burmeister, 1865)

= Uncieburia quadrilineata =

Species of beetle

Uncieburia quadrilineata is a species of beetle in the family Cerambycidae. It was described by Hermann Burmeister in 1865.
