= Heterops loreyi =

Scientific classification
- Domain: Eukaryota
- Kingdom: Animalia
- Phylum: Arthropoda
- Class: Insecta
- Order: Coleoptera
- Suborder: Polyphaga
- Infraorder: Cucujiformia
- Family: Cerambycidae
- Genus: Heterops
- Species: H. loreyi

Binomial name
- Heterops loreyi (Duponchel, 1837)

Species of beetle

Heterops loreyi is a species of beetle in the family Cerambycidae. It was described by Philogène Auguste Joseph Duponchel in 1837.
