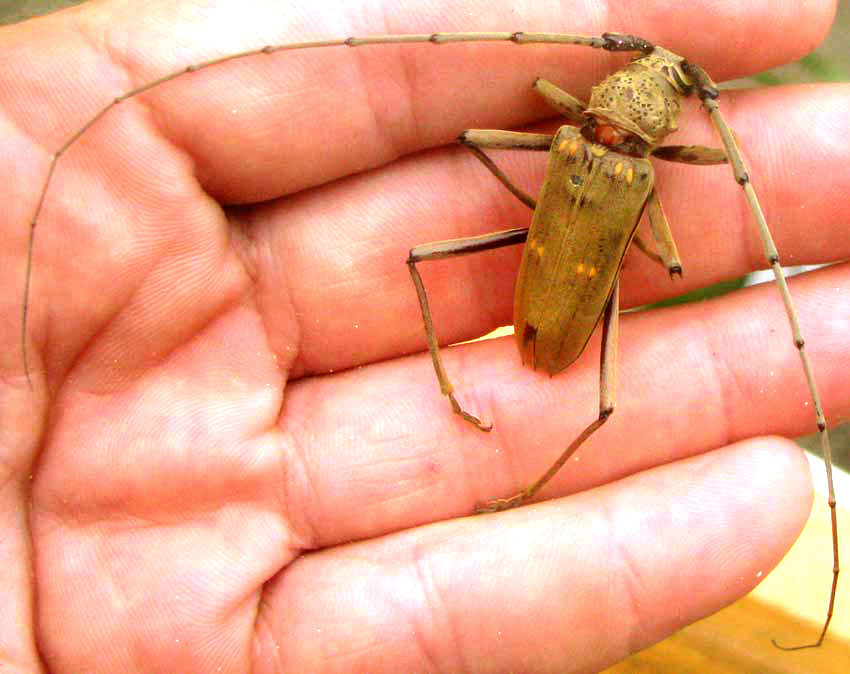
- Male with antennae about twice as long as a female's

Scientific classification
- Kingdom: Animalia
- Phylum: Arthropoda
- Clade: Pancrustacea
- Class: Insecta
- Order: Coleoptera
- Suborder: Polyphaga
- Infraorder: Cucujiformia
- Family: Cerambycidae
- Genus: Susuacanga
- Species: S. stigmatica

Binomial name
- Susuacanga stigmatica (Chevrolat, 1835)

Synonyms
- Eburia stigmatica Chevrolat, 1835; Coeleburia stigmatica Chevrolat, 1835; Eburia perforata LeConte, 1835; Eburia (Eburia) stigmatica Chevrolat, 1835

= Susuacanga stigmatica =

Species of insect

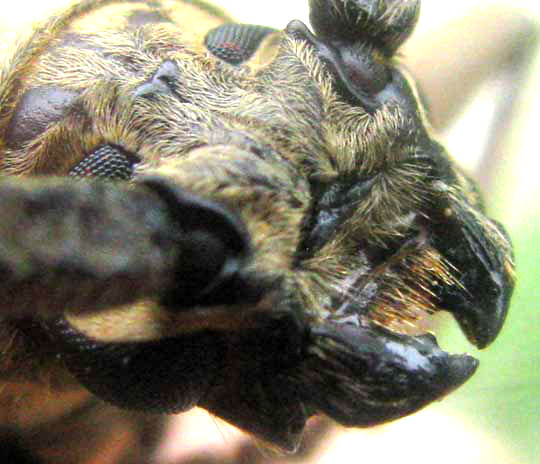
Susuacanga stigmatica head

Susuacanga stigmatica, with no commonly used English name, though some databases and local lists may provide a descriptive name such as speckle-necked longhorn beetle, is a species of beetle native to the New World, belonging to the family Cerambycidae.

== Discription ==
Susuacanga stigmatica, Is a big beetle with antennae longer than its body. Beyond that, here are some features helping with identification:

- The body is covered with ashy tawny hairs.
- The head is mounted high between the antenna bases. At the back, beside the top part of the prothorax, the pronotum, there are two black, triangular spots. The palps are hairy and the compound eyes are black with hatching. In females the hairy antennae are slightly longer than the body while on males they are twice as long.
- The top part of the prothorax, the pronotum, is as tall as wide, with low, broad-base spines along the sides, and covered with conspicuous dots. The scutellum is rounded toward the rear.
- The hard back cover comprising the hardened forewings, the elytra, is markedly wider than the pronotum. It is smooth with each elytron bearing four elongated spots in pairs, one pair near the elytron front, the other about midway the elytron's length.
- Legs and the body underside are the same color as the rest of the body. The four hind femurs bear pairs of spines at the "knees." Two other small spines occur at leg tips.

== Distribution ==
In the USA, Susuacanga stigmatica occurs in southern Texas. In Mexico it is widespread but apparently most common on the eastern side, particularly the Yucatan Peninsula. Also it is documented from Guatemala.

== Habitat ==
In southern Texas, Susuacanga stigmatica (as Eburia stigmatica) has been found beneath loose bark of Salix and Acacia trees. Also in southern Texas, the species has been documented beneath loose bark of Celtis, and were attracted with lights. Images on this page show an individual encountered at a beachside resort along Mexico's Yucatan Peninsula Caribbean coast where Celtis species could be found.

== Damage to trees ==
The larval stage of species in the Longhorned Beetle Family, the Cerambycidae, to which Susuacanga stigmatica belongs, often are called roundheaded wood borers. The larvae chew inner bark and sometimes the wood of limbs, trunks and main roots, though most longhorned beetles mainly attack trees already injured or stressed. Though little information has been published on Susuacanga stigmatica it can be assumed that its larvae behave the same.

== Taxonomy ==
In 1835 when Louis Alexandre Auguste Chevrolat formally described Susuacanga stigmatica under the name Eburia stigmatica, he remarked that his type specimen had been collected at "Long. 30 mil. Lat. 9" at Zimapán in central Mexico, and "D. Gory" was associated with the comment. This was French entomologist Hippolyte Louis Gory who specialized in beetles. Chevrolat frequently mentioned having access to specimens through Gory, who does not seem to have visited Mexico himself.

=== Etymology ===
The species name stigmatica is based on the Latin stigma meaning "mark, brand." The -tica results from the feminine form of the ecclesiastical Latin stigmaticus. The stigmas referred to must be the conspicuous and distinctive marks or dots covering the species's prothorax.
