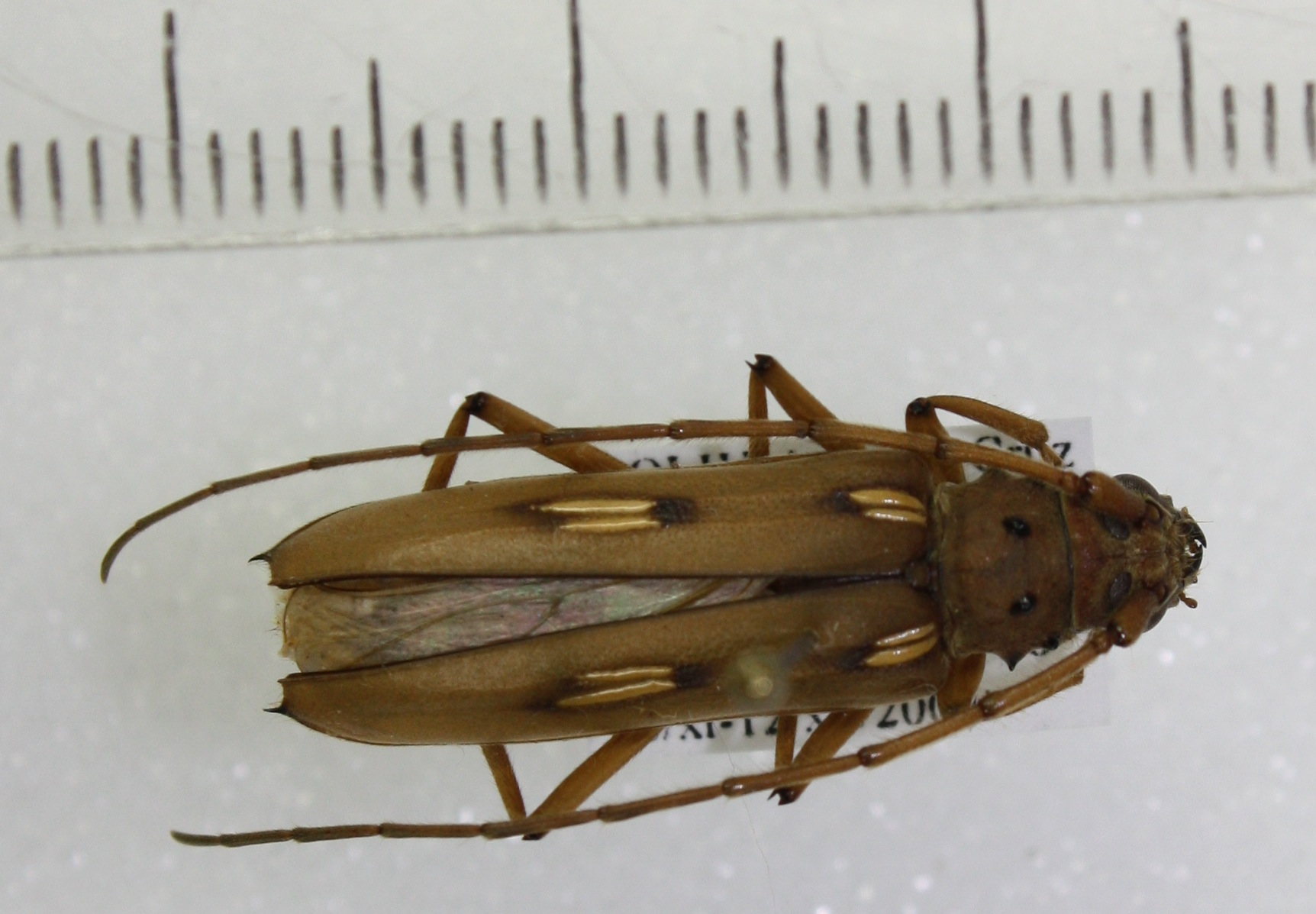

Scientific classification
- Kingdom: Animalia
- Phylum: Arthropoda
- Class: Insecta
- Order: Coleoptera
- Suborder: Polyphaga
- Infraorder: Cucujiformia
- Family: Cerambycidae
- Genus: Pantomallus
- Species: P. tristis

Binomial name
- Pantomallus tristis Blanchard in Orbigny, 1847

= Pantomallus tristis =

Species of beetle

Pantomallus tristis is a species of beetle in the family Cerambycidae. It was described by Blanchard in 1847.
