= Quiacaua vespertina =

Scientific classification
- Kingdom: Animalia
- Phylum: Arthropoda
- Class: Insecta
- Order: Coleoptera
- Suborder: Polyphaga
- Infraorder: Cucujiformia
- Family: Cerambycidae
- Genus: Quiacaua
- Species: Q. vespertina

Binomial name
- Quiacaua vespertina (Monné & Martins, 1973)

Synonyms
- Eburodacrys vespertina Monné & Martins 1973

Species of beetle

Quiacaua vespertina is a species of beetle in the family Cerambycidae. It was described by Miguel Angel Monné and Ubirajara Ribeiro Martins in 1973. It occurs in eastern and southeastern Brazil in the states of Minas Gerais, Espírito Santo, Bahia, and Rio de Janeiro.

Quiacaua vespertina measure 11.6–22.2 mm (0.46–0.87 in) in length.
