= Dioridium hirsutum =

Scientific classification
- Kingdom: Animalia
- Phylum: Arthropoda
- Class: Insecta
- Order: Coleoptera
- Suborder: Polyphaga
- Infraorder: Cucujiformia
- Family: Cerambycidae
- Genus: Dioridium
- Species: D. hirsutum

Binomial name
- Dioridium hirsutum Zajciw, 1961

Species of beetle

Dioridium hirsutum is a species of beetle in the family Cerambycidae.
