= Heterops robusta =

Scientific classification
- Kingdom: Animalia
- Phylum: Arthropoda
- Class: Insecta
- Order: Coleoptera
- Suborder: Polyphaga
- Infraorder: Cucujiformia
- Family: Cerambycidae
- Genus: Heterops
- Species: H. robusta

Binomial name
- Heterops robusta Cazier & Lacey, 1952

Species of beetle

Heterops robusta is a species of beetle in the family Cerambycidae. It was described by Cazier and Lacey in 1952.
