= Erosida =

Scientific classification
- Kingdom: Animalia
- Phylum: Arthropoda
- Class: Insecta
- Order: Coleoptera
- Suborder: Polyphaga
- Infraorder: Cucujiformia
- Family: Cerambycidae
- Subfamily: Cerambycinae
- Tribe: Eburiini
- Genus: Erosida; Thomson, 1861

Genus of beetles

Erosida is a genus of beetles in the family Cerambycidae, containing the following species:

- Erosida delia Thomson, 1860
- Erosida formosa (Blanchard, 1847)
- Erosida gratiosa (Blanchard, 1847)
- Erosida lineola (Fabricius, 1781)
- Erosida yucatana Giesbert, 1985
