= Quiacaua =

Scientific classification
- Domain: Eukaryota
- Kingdom: Animalia
- Phylum: Arthropoda
- Class: Insecta
- Order: Coleoptera
- Suborder: Polyphaga
- Infraorder: Cucujiformia
- Family: Cerambycidae
- Subfamily: Cerambycinae
- Tribe: Eburiini
- Genus: Quiacaua; Martins, 1997

Genus of beetles

Quiacaua is a genus of beetles in the family Cerambycidae, containing the following species:

- Quiacaua abacta (Martins, 1981)
- Quiacaua taguaiba Martins, 1997
- Quiacaua vespertina (Monné & Martins, 1973)
