= Cupanoscelis =

Scientific classification
- Kingdom: Animalia
- Phylum: Arthropoda
- Class: Insecta
- Order: Coleoptera
- Suborder: Polyphaga
- Infraorder: Cucujiformia
- Family: Cerambycidae
- Subfamily: Cerambycinae
- Tribe: Eburiini
- Genus: Cupanoscelis; Gounelle, 1909

Genus of beetles

Cupanoscelis is a genus of beetles in the family Cerambycidae, containing the following species:

- Cupanoscelis clavipes Gounelle, 1909
- Cupanoscelis heteroclita Gounelle, 1909
- Cupanoscelis inermis Monné & Martins, 1992
- Cupanoscelis latitibialis Monné & Martins, 1992
- Cupanoscelis sanmartini Martins & Monné, 1975
- Cupanoscelis serrana Martins & Galileo, 1999
