= Tumiditarsus =

Scientific classification
- Domain: Eukaryota
- Kingdom: Animalia
- Phylum: Arthropoda
- Class: Insecta
- Order: Coleoptera
- Suborder: Polyphaga
- Infraorder: Cucujiformia
- Family: Cerambycidae
- Tribe: Eburiini
- Genus: Tumiditarsus; Zajciw, 1961
- Species: T. cicatricornis

Binomial name
- Tumiditarsus cicatricornis Zajciw, 1961

Genus of beetles

Tumiditarsus is a genus of longhorned beetles in the family Cerambycidae. This genus has a single species, Tumiditarsus cicatricornis, found in Argentina and Paraguay.
