= Solangella =

Scientific classification
- Kingdom: Animalia
- Phylum: Arthropoda
- Class: Insecta
- Order: Coleoptera
- Suborder: Polyphaga
- Infraorder: Cucujiformia
- Family: Cerambycidae
- Tribe: Eburiini
- Genus: Solangella; Martins, 1997

Genus of beetles

Solangella is a genus of beetles in the family Cerambycidae, containing the following species:

- Solangella lachrymosa (Martins & Monné, 1975)
- Solangella meridana (Bates, 1872)
- Solangella micromacula Martins, 1997
