= Dioridium =

Scientific classification
- Kingdom: Animalia
- Phylum: Arthropoda
- Clade: Pancrustacea
- Class: Insecta
- Order: Coleoptera
- Suborder: Polyphaga
- Infraorder: Cucujiformia
- Family: Cerambycidae
- Tribe: Eburiini
- Genus: Dioridium; Zajciw, 1961

Synonyms
- Mocajuba Lane, 1972

Genus of beetles

Dioridium is a genus of beetles in the family Cerambycidae, containing the following species:

- Dioridium borgmeieri (Lane, 1972)
- Dioridium hirsutum Zajciw, 1961
