= Heterops =

Scientific classification
- Domain: Eukaryota
- Kingdom: Animalia
- Phylum: Arthropoda
- Class: Insecta
- Order: Coleoptera
- Suborder: Polyphaga
- Infraorder: Cucujiformia
- Family: Cerambycidae
- Tribe: Eburiini
- Genus: Heterops

Genus of beetles

Heterops is a genus of beetles in the family Cerambycidae, containing the following species:

- Heterops bicolor Fisher, 1936
- Heterops bipartitus Lacordaire, 1869
- Heterops cubaecola Fisher, 1947
- Heterops dimidiatus (Chevrolat, 1838)
- Heterops duvali Fisher, 1947
- Heterops hispaniolae Fisher, 1932
- Heterops lanieri (Chevrolat, 1838)
- Heterops loreyi (Duponchel, 1837)
- Heterops robusta Cazier & Lacey, 1952
