= Volxemia =

Scientific classification
- Kingdom: Animalia
- Phylum: Arthropoda
- Class: Insecta
- Order: Coleoptera
- Suborder: Polyphaga
- Infraorder: Cucujiformia
- Family: Cerambycidae
- Tribe: Eburiini
- Genus: Volxemia; Lameere, 1884

Genus of beetles

Volxemia is a genus of beetles in the family Cerambycidae, containing the following species:

- Volxemia dianella Lameere, 1884
- Volxemia seabrai Zajciw, 1968
