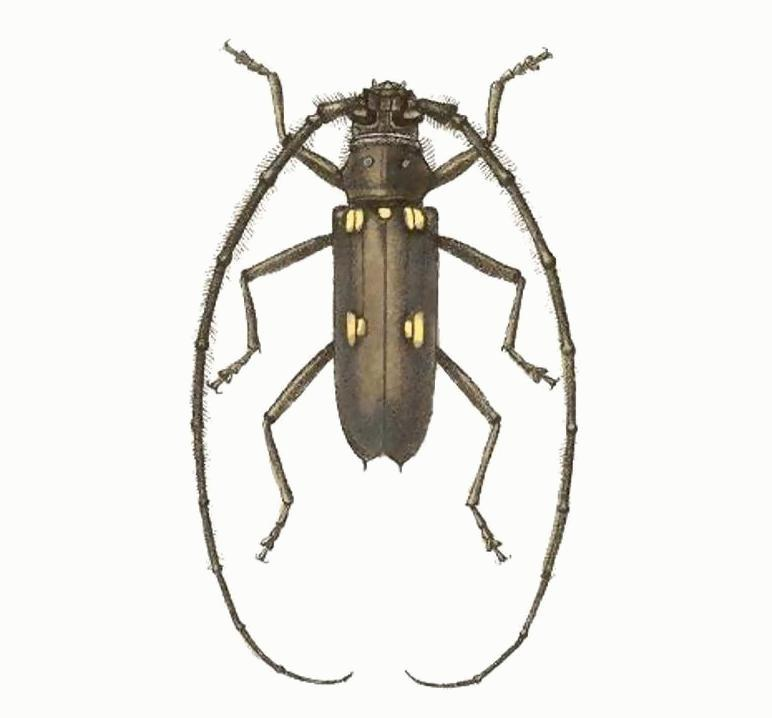
- Pantomallus fuligineus

Scientific classification
- Kingdom: Animalia
- Phylum: Arthropoda
- Class: Insecta
- Order: Coleoptera
- Suborder: Polyphaga
- Infraorder: Cucujiformia
- Family: Cerambycidae
- Subfamily: Cerambycinae
- Tribe: Eburiini
- Genus: Pantomallus; Lacordaire, 1869

= Pantomallus =

Genus of beetles

Pantomallus is a genus of beetles in the family Cerambycidae, containing the following species:

- Pantomallus costulatus (Bates, 1870)
- Pantomallus martinezi Martins & Galileo, 2002
- Pantomallus morosus (Audinet-Serville, 1834)
- Pantomallus pallidus Aurivillius, 1923
- Pantomallus piruatinga Martins, 1997
- Pantomallus proletarius (Erichson, 1847)
- Pantomallus reclusus (Martins, 1981)
- Pantomallus rugosus Martins & Galileo, 2005
- Pantomallus titinga Martins & Galileo, 2005
- Pantomallus tristis Blanchard in Orbigny, 1847
