= Eburella =

Scientific classification
- Kingdom: Animalia
- Phylum: Arthropoda
- Class: Insecta
- Order: Coleoptera
- Suborder: Polyphaga
- Infraorder: Cucujiformia
- Family: Cerambycidae
- Tribe: Eburiini
- Genus: Eburella; Martins & Monné, 1973

Genus of beetles

Eburella is a genus of beetles in the family Cerambycidae, containing the following species:

- Eburella longicollis Martins & Galileo, 1999
- Eburella pinima Martins, 1997
- Eburella pumicosa Monné & Martins, 1973
