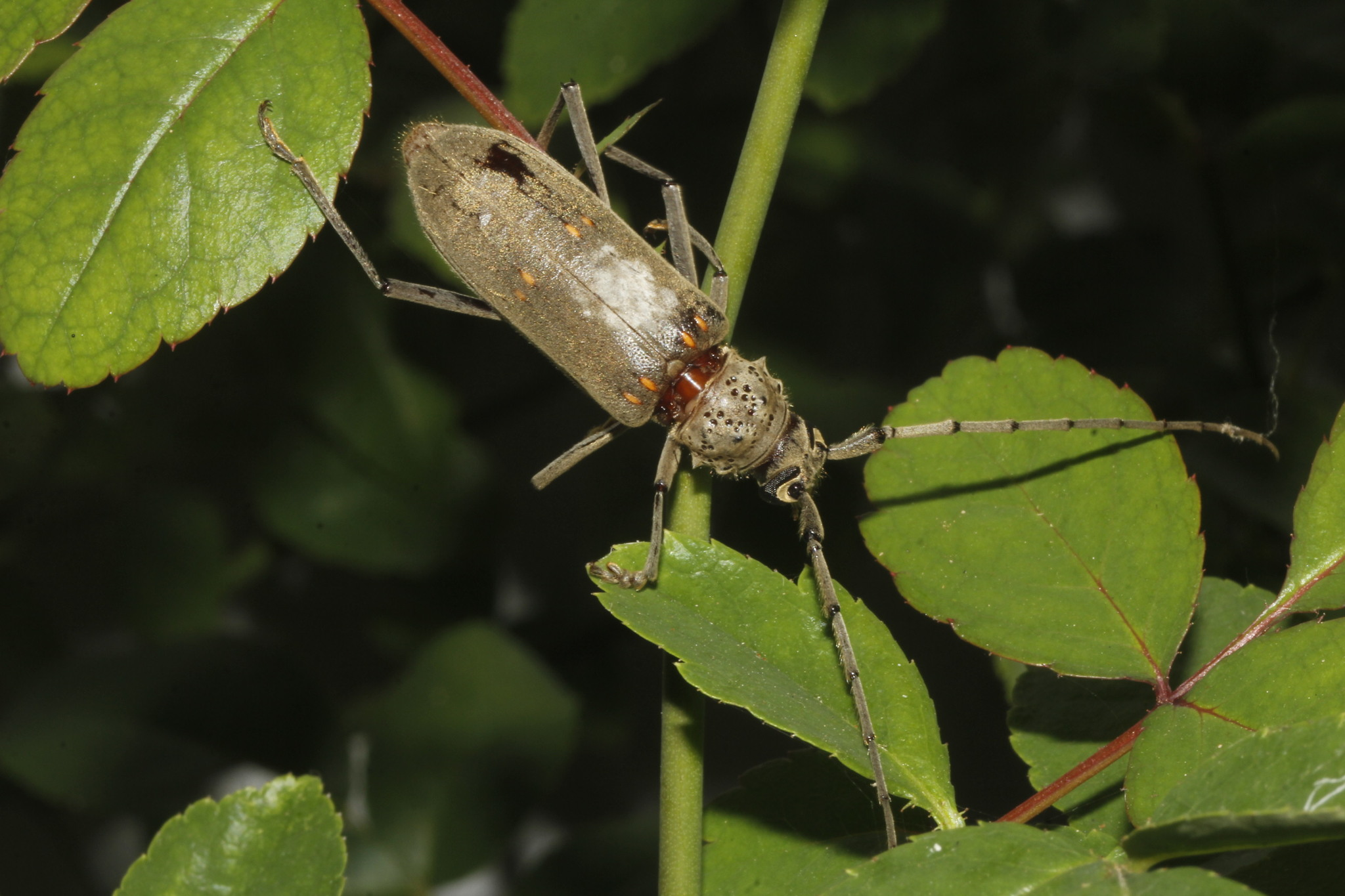
- Susuacanga stigmatica

Scientific classification
- Domain: Eukaryota
- Kingdom: Animalia
- Phylum: Arthropoda
- Class: Insecta
- Order: Coleoptera
- Suborder: Polyphaga
- Infraorder: Cucujiformia
- Family: Cerambycidae
- Subfamily: Cerambycinae
- Tribe: Eburiini
- Genus: Susuacanga; Martins, 1997

= Susuacanga =

Genus of beetles

Susuacanga is a genus of beetles in the family Cerambycidae, containing the following species:

- Susuacanga maculicornis (Bates, 1870)
- Susuacanga octoguttata (Germar, 1821)
- Susuacanga stigmatica (Chevrolat, 1835)
- Susuacanga unicolor (Bates, 1870)
