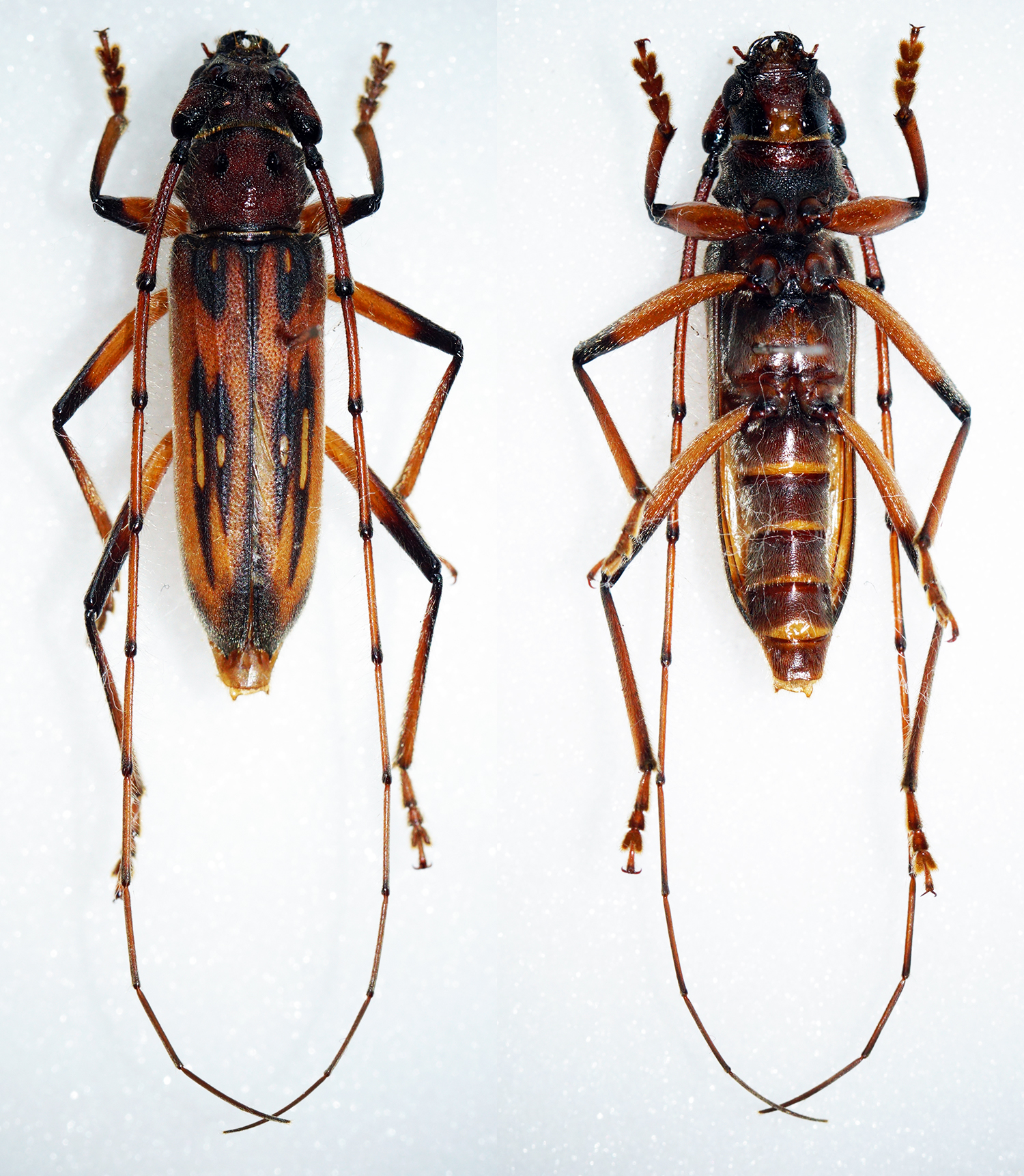
- Uncieburia quadrilineata

Scientific classification
- Kingdom: Animalia
- Phylum: Arthropoda
- Class: Insecta
- Order: Coleoptera
- Suborder: Polyphaga
- Infraorder: Cucujiformia
- Family: Cerambycidae
- Tribe: Eburiini
- Genus: Uncieburia; Martins, 1997

= Uncieburia =

Genus of beetles

Uncieburia is a genus of beetles in the family Cerambycidae, containing the following species:

- Uncieburia nigricans (Gounelle, 1909)
- Uncieburia quadrilineata (Burmeister, 1865)
- Uncieburia rogersi (Bates, 1870)
