= Eburiola =

Eburiola geminata

Scientific classification
- Kingdom: Animalia
- Phylum: Arthropoda
- Class: Insecta
- Order: Coleoptera
- Suborder: Polyphaga
- Infraorder: Cucujiformia
- Family: Cerambycidae
- Genus: Eburiola
- Species: E. geminata

Binomial name
- Eburiola geminata (Fabricius, 1787)

Genus of beetles

Eburiola geminata is a species of beetle in the family Cerambycidae, the only species in the genus Eburiola.
