= Simplexeburia =

Simplexeburia divisa

Scientific classification
- Kingdom: Animalia
- Phylum: Arthropoda
- Class: Insecta
- Order: Coleoptera
- Suborder: Polyphaga
- Infraorder: Cucujiformia
- Family: Cerambycidae
- Genus: Simplexeburia
- Species: S. divisa

Binomial name
- Simplexeburia divisa Martins & Galileo, 2010

Genus of beetles

Simplexeburia divisa is a species of beetle in the family Cerambycidae, the only species in the genus Simplexeburia.
