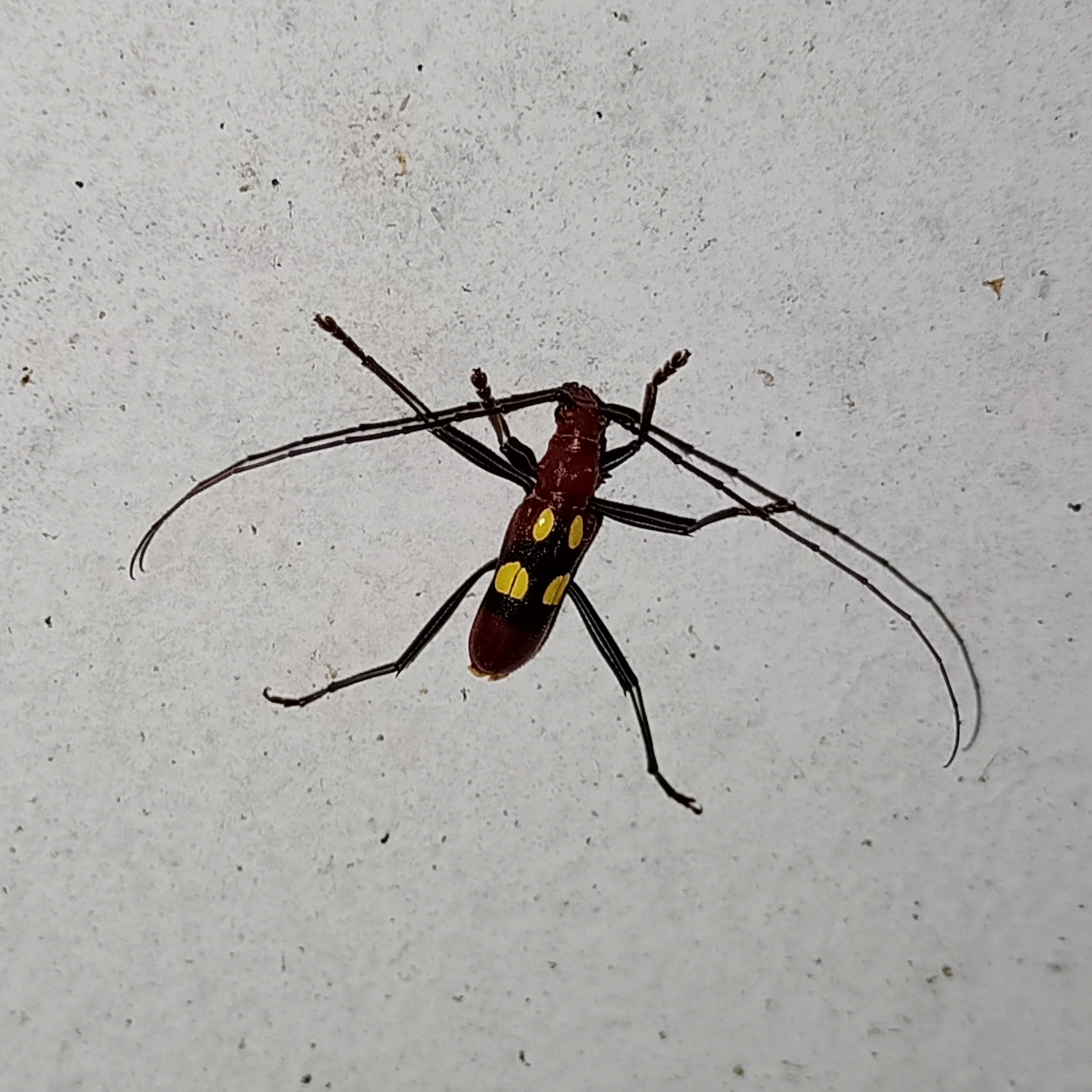
- Pronuba decora, Brasil

Scientific classification
- Domain: Eukaryota
- Kingdom: Animalia
- Phylum: Arthropoda
- Class: Insecta
- Order: Coleoptera
- Suborder: Polyphaga
- Infraorder: Cucujiformia
- Family: Cerambycidae
- Subfamily: Cerambycinae
- Tribe: Eburiini
- Genus: Pronuba; Thomson, 1861

Synonyms
- Microspiloma Bates, 1867

= Pronuba (beetle) =

Genus of beetles

Pronuba is a genus of long-horned beetles in the family Cerambycidae. There are about five described species in Pronuba, found in Central and South America.

== Species ==
These five species belong to the genus Pronuba:

- Pronuba decora Thomson, 1861 (Argentina, Brazil, and Paraguay)
- Pronuba dorilis (Bates, 1867) (Bolivia, Brazil, and Ecuador)
- Pronuba gracilis Hovore & Giesbert, 1990 (Costa Rica)
- Pronuba incognita Hovore & Giesbert, 1990 (Costa Rica, Honduras, and Panama)
- Pronuba lenkoi Monné & Martins, 1974 (Brazil and Bolivia)
