= Opades =

Opades costipennis

Scientific classification
- Kingdom: Animalia
- Phylum: Arthropoda
- Class: Insecta
- Order: Coleoptera
- Suborder: Polyphaga
- Infraorder: Cucujiformia
- Family: Cerambycidae
- Genus: Opades
- Species: O. costipennis

Binomial name
- Opades costipennis (Buquet in Guérin-Méneville, 1844)

Genus of beetles

Opades costipennis is a species of beetle in the family Cerambycidae, the only species in the genus Opades.
