= Eburiaca =

Eburiaca sinopia

Scientific classification
- Kingdom: Animalia
- Phylum: Arthropoda
- Class: Insecta
- Order: Coleoptera
- Suborder: Polyphaga
- Infraorder: Cucujiformia
- Family: Cerambycidae
- Genus: Eburiaca
- Species: E. sinopia

Binomial name
- Eburiaca sinopia Martins, 1999

Genus of beetles

Eburiaca sinopia is a species of beetle in the family Cerambycidae, the only species in the genus Eburiaca.
