= Neoeburia =

Neoeburia turuna

Scientific classification
- Kingdom: Animalia
- Phylum: Arthropoda
- Class: Insecta
- Order: Coleoptera
- Suborder: Polyphaga
- Infraorder: Cucujiformia
- Family: Cerambycidae
- Genus: Neoeburia
- Species: N. turuna

Binomial name
- Neoeburia turuna Galileo & Martins, 2006

Genus of beetles

Neoeburia turuna is a species of beetle in the family Cerambycidae, the only species in the genus Neoeburia.
