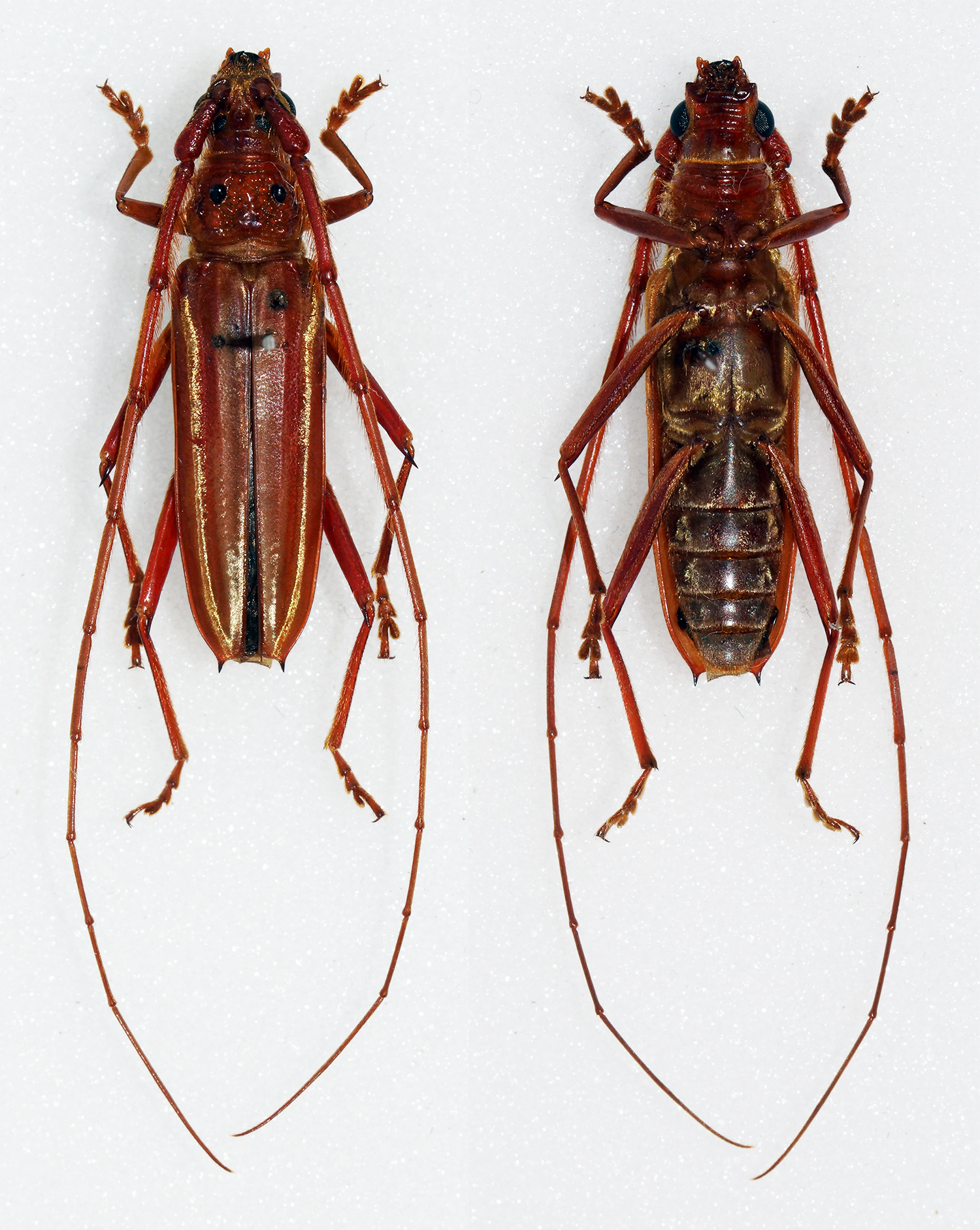

Scientific classification
- Domain: Eukaryota
- Kingdom: Animalia
- Phylum: Arthropoda
- Class: Insecta
- Order: Coleoptera
- Suborder: Polyphaga
- Infraorder: Cucujiformia
- Family: Cerambycidae
- Genus: Styliceps
- Species: S. sericatus

Binomial name
- Styliceps sericatus (Pascoe, 1859)

Synonyms
- Cerambyx striatus Voet, 1781 (Unav.); Caragenia sericata Pascoe, 1859; Ceragenia amazonica Thomson, 1861; Styliceps sericans Lacordaire, 1868 (Missp.)

= Styliceps =

Genus of beetles

Styliceps sericatus is a species of beetle in the family Cerambycidae, the only species in the genus Styliceps.
