= Eburodacrystola =

Eburodacrystola pickeli

Scientific classification
- Kingdom: Animalia
- Phylum: Arthropoda
- Clade: Pancrustacea
- Class: Insecta
- Order: Coleoptera
- Suborder: Polyphaga
- Infraorder: Cucujiformia
- Family: Cerambycidae
- Genus: Eburodacrystola
- Species: E. pickeli

Binomial name
- Eburodacrystola pickeli Melzer, 1928

Genus of beetles

Eburodacrystola pickeli is a species of beetle in the family Cerambycidae, the only species in the genus Eburodacrystola.
