= Eburostola =

Eburostola amazonica

Scientific classification
- Kingdom: Animalia
- Phylum: Arthropoda
- Class: Insecta
- Order: Coleoptera
- Suborder: Polyphaga
- Infraorder: Cucujiformia
- Family: Cerambycidae
- Genus: Eburostola
- Species: E. amazonica

Binomial name
- Eburostola amazonica Tippmann, 1960

Genus of beetles

Eburostola amazonica is a species of beetle in the family Cerambycidae, the only species in the genus Eburostola.
